= Arden (estate) =

Historic house in New York, United States

- Arden (E.H. Harriman Estate)
- U.S. National Register of Historic Places
- U.S. National Historic Landmark
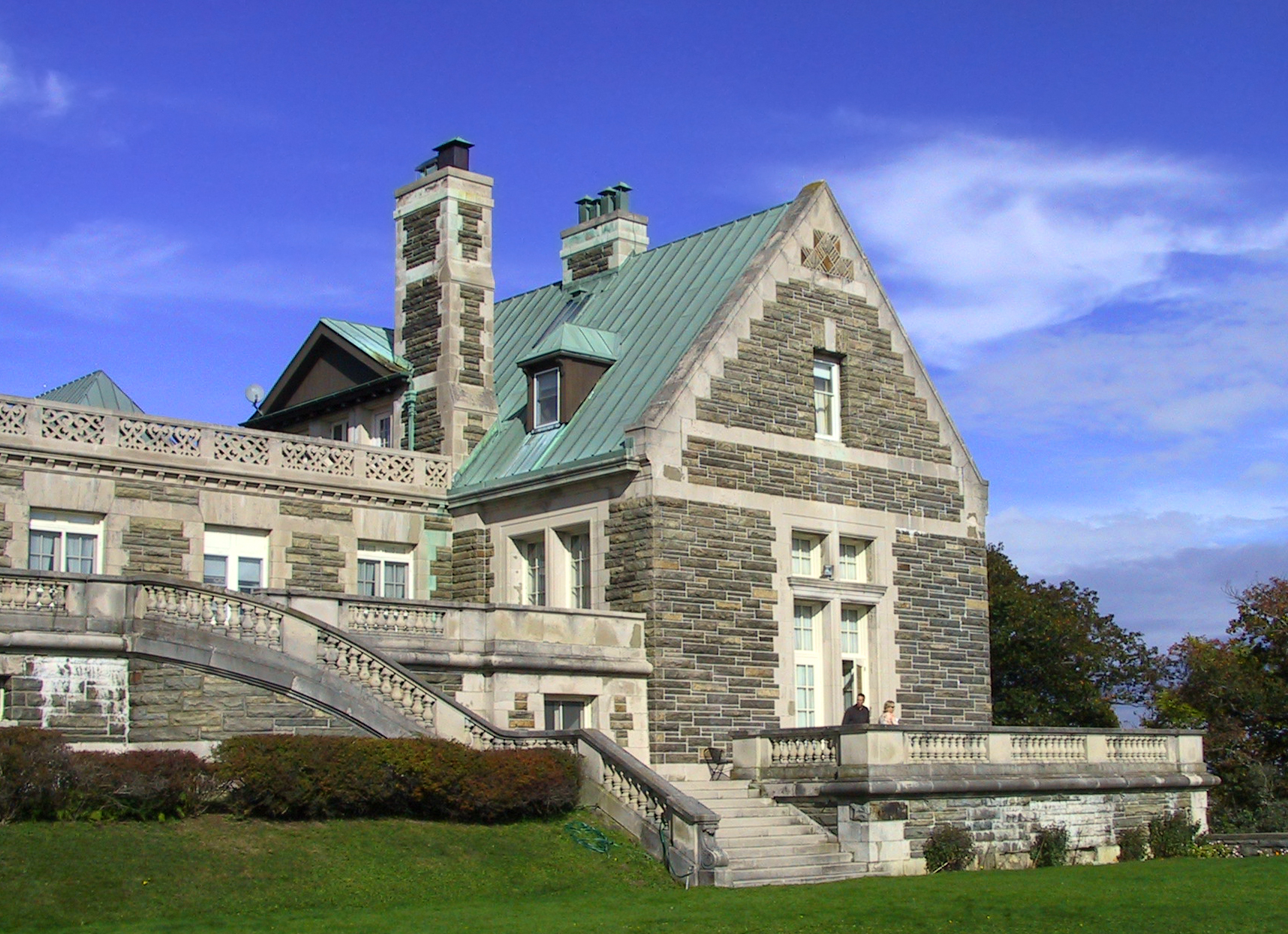
- Wing of the house in 2003

- Location within New York Location within the United States
- Interactive map showing Arden's location
- Location: Harriman, New York
- Nearest city: Newburgh
- Coordinates: 41°17′48″N 74°07′09″W
- Area: 450 acres (180 ha)
- Built: 1886 or 1909
- Architect: Carrère and Hastings
- NRHP reference No.: 66000561

Significant dates
- Added to NRHP: November 13, 1966
- Designated NHL: November 13, 1966

Arden is a historic estate outside Harriman, New York, the 450-acre (0.70 sq mi; 1.8 km^{2}) remains of a much larger property originally assembled by railroad magnate Edward Henry Harriman. By the early 1900s, Harriman owned 40,000 acres (63 sq mi; 160 km^{2}) in the area, half of it comprising the Arden Estate. The main house is at the top of a 1,300 ft (400 m) bluff in the Ramapo Mountains east of the village, reachable by Arden House Road from NY 17. Since 2011, it has been owned by the nonprofit Research Center on Natural Conservation, which operates Arden House as a conference center with 97 guest rooms.

== History ==
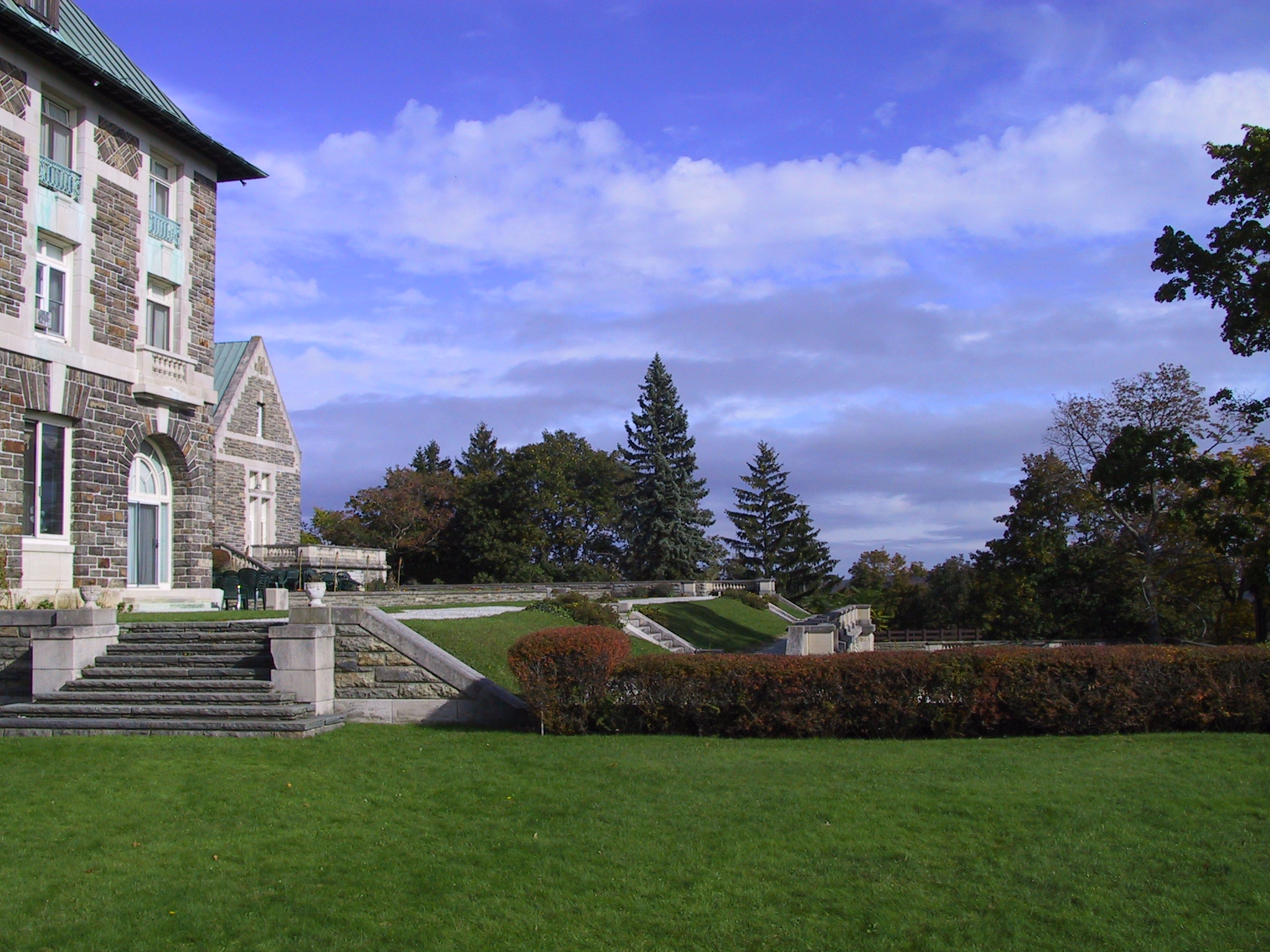
View of the garden in 2003

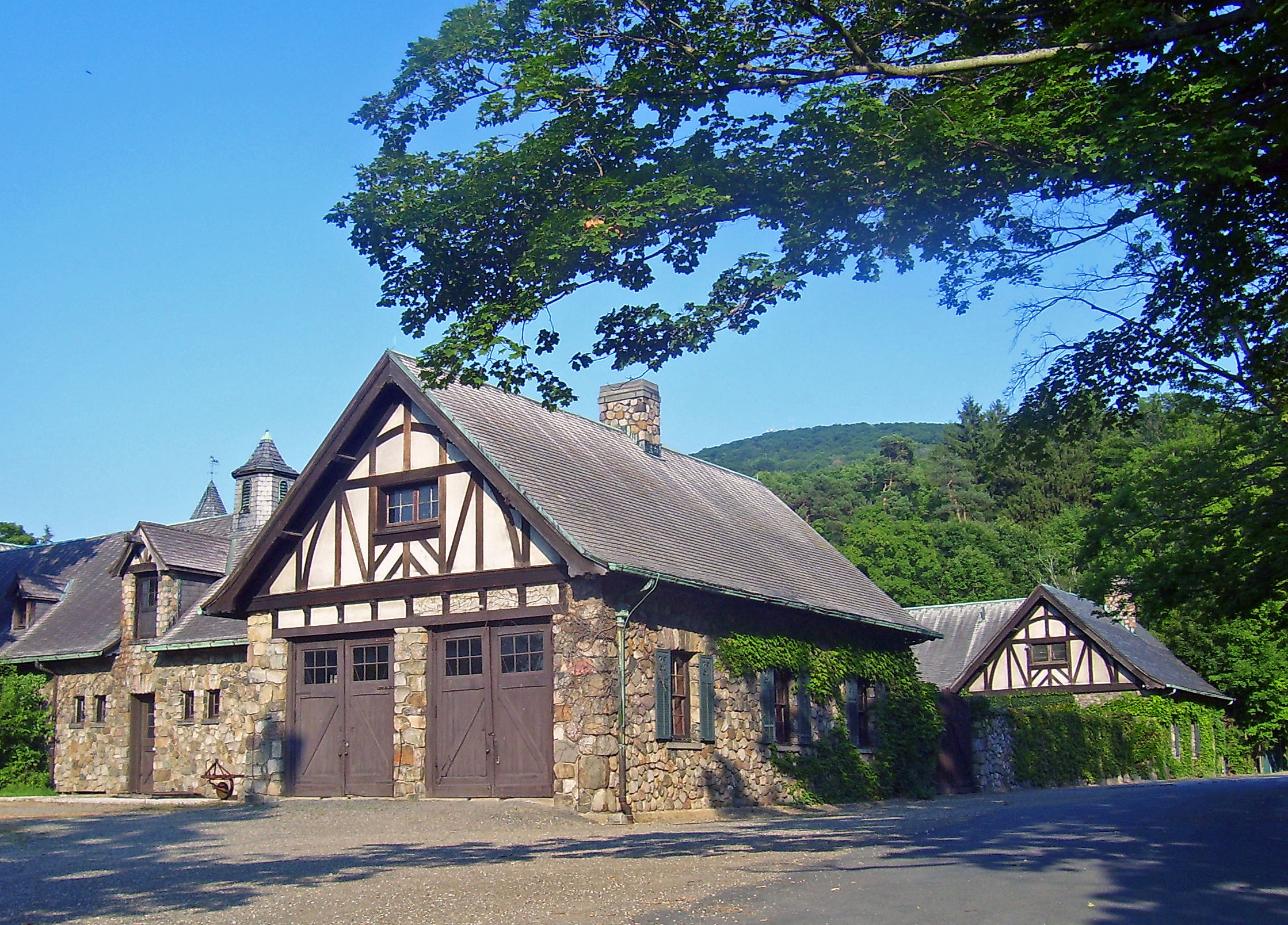
The coachouse in 2007

Harriman bought the original 7,863-acre (31.82 km^{2}) Arden estate at auction for $52,500, on September 17, 1886. It had belonged to Peter Parrott (brother of Parrott gun inventor Robert P. Parrott) and dubbed "Arden" after his wife's maiden name. Over the next several years, Harriman purchased an additional 20,000 acres (81 km^{2}), almost forty different parcels of land, and built forty miles (64 km) of bridle paths, which he used to scour on horseback searching for a site to build his home. Harriman hired Carrère and Hastings to design Arden House, which was begun in 1905. Harriman had planned it for many years, but sadly lived there for only a few months before his death in 1909.

The estate passed on to his widow, Mary Averell Harriman, who a year later donated 10,000 acres (40 km^{2}) and one million dollars to New York State to start Harriman State Park.

The 100,000 sq ft (9,300 m^{2}) Arden House was designed in an American Beaux-Arts style, and unique among the Gilded Age Estates for being wholly American in design, materials, and execution. When many original American robber barons were building European-style castles upstate, Harriman sought to demonstrate American excellence by having his home built and furnished by domestic artisans. Even most of the stone used came from the estate, produced in abundance when a 50-acre (0.20 km^{2}) plateau was blasted out of the summit of Mount Orama to site the home and its gardens.

To aid in construction, railroadman Harriman had a cog railway installed for hauling men and materials up the steep slope, bypassing the meandering 3 mi (4.8 km) long gently inclined carriageway.

The home features a dramatic music room, modeled after a medieval great hall. Around the central courtyard is a brick corridor lined with murals by Barry Faulkner. Harriman commissioned a number of American artists to decorate the house. James Earle Fraser did a bas-relief portrait of Harriman over one of the fireplaces, as well as a fountain in the interior court; Malvina Hoffman did a bust of Mrs. Harriman; and Charles Cary Rumsey did a fountain of the Three Graces, a marble fireplace surround that featured a caricature of architect Thomas Hastings, and corbel carvings of bighorn sheep in the music room. He also managed to marry Harriman's daughter, Mary, in 1910, much to the surprise of society. Lining the staircase were Herter Brothers tapestries depicting the creation of the house. On the second floor was an "Indian Corridor", featuring photographs of Native Americans taken by Edward S. Curtis during the Harriman Alaska Expedition of 1899.

In 1915 Mary Averell Harriman, gave the house to her son, W. Averell Harriman as a wedding present (but she continued to live in the west wing of the building until her death in 1932). After the U.S. entered World War II, the family offered the house to the U.S. Navy, which turned it into the first of the Navy's convalescent hospitals, modeled on those that England and Russia had already successfully created. In 1950, Averell Harriman and his brother Roland deeded the property to Columbia University, as "home of The American Assembly", a public policy institution founded by Dwight D. Eisenhower the same year. It became primarily used as a center for executive management programs. The house was identified as America's first conference center, and became a National Historic Landmark in 1966 but is not open to the public.

In 2007, the Open Space Institute bought Arden House and its surrounding 450 acres (1.8 km^{2}). The house commands extensive views of the Ramapo River Valley. The property brings the total of preserved lands that were once owned by the Harriman family in New York State to nearly 70,000 acres (280 km^{2}), including 5,205-acre (21.06 km^{2}) Bear Mountain, Harriman and much of 22,180-acre (89.8 km^{2}) Sterling Forest State Parks.

In 2010, the Open Space Institute put the house up for sale. The house was purchased in 2011 by a Chinese-backed nonprofit, the Research Center on Natural Conservation, Inc. In 2015, the same group bought the bankrupt New York Military Academy.

== See also ==
- List of largest houses in the United States
- List of National Historic Landmarks in New York
- National Register of Historic Places in Orange County, New York

== Bibliography ==
- Ossman, Laurie; Ewing, Heather P. (2011). Carrère & Hastings. New York: Rizzoli International Publications. ISBN 978-0-8478-3564-5. OCLC 698332654.
