= Mary Harriman Rumsey =

American social activist and government official

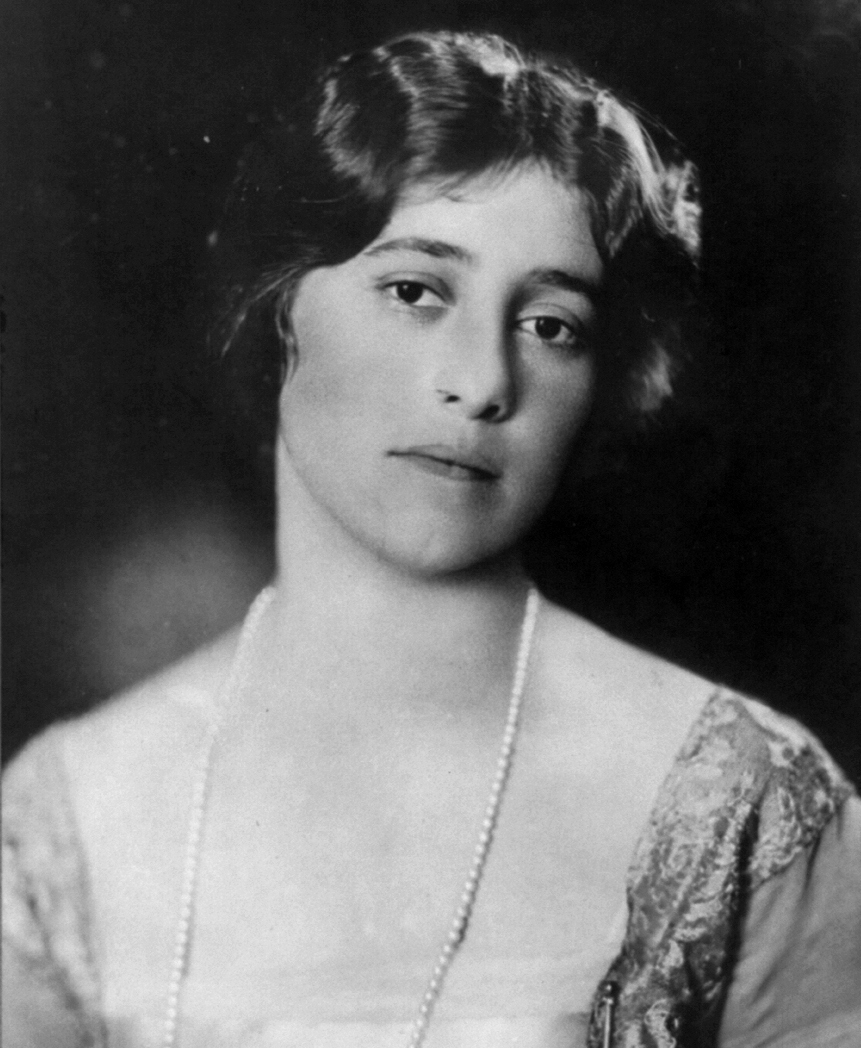
- Born: November 17, 1881; New York City, U.S.
- Died: December 18, 1934 (aged 53); Washington, D.C., U.S.
- Resting place: St. John's Church Cemetery, Arden, New York, U.S.
- Education: Barnard College
- Occupations: Chair of the Consumer Advisory Board, National Recovery Administration
- Political party: Democratic
- Spouse: Charles Cary Rumsey
- Children: 3
- Parent(s): E. H. Harriman; Mary Averell
- Relatives: W. Averell Harriman (brother); E. Roland Harriman (brother)

Mary Harriman Rumsey (November 17, 1881 – December 18, 1934) was an American social activist, government official and heiress of the wealthy Harriman family. She was the founder of The Junior League for the Promotion of Settlement Movements, later known as the Junior League of the City of New York of the Association of Junior Leagues International Inc, and served as Chair of the Consumer Advisory Board of the National Recovery Administration. Mary was the daughter of railroad magnate E. H. Harriman and sister to W. Averell Harriman, former New York State Governor and United States Diplomat. In 2015 she was posthumously inducted into the National Women's Hall of Fame.

== Early life ==
Mary Harriman Rumsey was born on November 17, 1881, the oldest of six children of railroad industrialist E. H. Harriman (1848–1909) and his wife, Mary Averell Harriman (1851–1932).

Her siblings were Henry Neilson Harriman (1883–1888); Cornelia Harriman (1884–1966), who married Robert Livingston Gerry (1877–1957); Carol Averell Harriman (1889–1948), who married R. Penn Smith in 1917 and, after his death in 1929, married W. Plunket Stewart, a racing stable owner in 1930; William Averell Harriman (1891–1986), who in 1955 became the Governor of New York and who married Kitty Lanier Lawrence, then Marie Norton Whitney (1903–1970), and lastly Pamela Beryl Digby Churchill Hayward (1920–1997); and Edward Roland Noel Harriman (1895–1978), who married Gladys Fries (1896–1983).

Mary attended Barnard College, where she specialized in sociology and was a member of Kappa Kappa Gamma. While there, she worked with Charles B. Davenport at the Cold Spring Harbor Laboratory, becoming so enamored of eugenics that her friends nicknamed her "Eugenia." On Mary's urging, her mother endowed the Eugenics Record Office at Cold Spring Harbor in 1910.

== Career ==
=== The Junior League ===
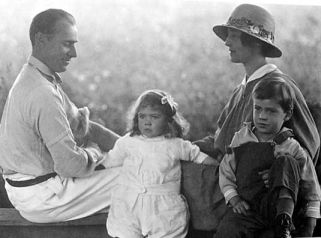
Charles, Mary Averell, Mary, Charles Jr., c.1919

Inspired by a lecture on the settlement movement, Mary, along with several friends, began volunteering at the College Settlement on Rivington Street in New York City's Lower East Side, a large immigrant enclave. Through her work at the College Settlement, Mary became convinced that there was more she could do to help others. Subsequently, Mary and a group of 80 debutantes established the Junior League for the Promotion of Settlement Movements in 1901, while she was still a student at Barnard College. The purpose of the Junior League would be to unite interested debutantes in joining the Settlement Movement in New York City.

Realizing their lack of experience in dealing with the issues that faced people seeking help at the settlement house, Mary and League leaders brought together experts on the Settlement Movement to provide lectures and instruction to Junior League members. With better preparation came greater engagement leading to increased interest in membership by women notable in New York society; members would come to include Eleanor Roosevelt, Dorothy Whitney Straight and Ruth Draper.

As word of the work of the young Junior League women in New York spread, women throughout the country and beyond formed Junior Leagues in their communities. In time, Leagues would expand their efforts beyond settlement house work to respond to the social, health and educational issues of their respective communities. In 1921, approximately 30 Leagues banded together to form the Association of Junior Leagues of America to provide support to one another. With the creation of the Association, it was Mary who insisted that although it was important for all Leagues to learn from one another and share best practices, each League was ultimately beholden to its respective community and should thus function to serve that community's needs.

As the 20th century progressed, more Junior Leagues were formed throughout the United States, Canada, Mexico and the United Kingdom. Now known as the Association of Junior Leagues International Inc. (AJLI), the organization encompasses 292 member Leagues, with over 160,000 members committed to continuing the legacy established by its founder.

=== Consumer Advisory Board ===
In 1933, President Franklin D. Roosevelt appointed Mary to chair the Consumer Advisory Board (CAB) of the National Recovery Administration (NRA), the first government consumer rights group.

Her advocacy for farming cooperatives and cooperative theory became a strategic cornerstone for the Consumer Advisory Board. Rumsey institutionalized consumer protection by scaling these groups nationally and establishing a formal reporting pipeline for public grievances.

Mary Rumsey's legacy to New Deal reforms would be continued by her younger brother, W. Averell Harriman. Averell was encouraged by his older sister to leave his finance job and join her and their friends, the Roosevelts, to advance the goals of the New Deal. Averell joined the NRA, marking the beginning of his political career.

== Personal life ==
On May 27, 1910, Mary married sculptor and polo player Charles Cary Rumsey (1879–1922), shortly after the death of her father on September 9, 1909. Rumsey had been working at Arden House, creating one of the principal fireplace surrounds, as well as other decorative sculpture. By all accounts, the two had a happy marriage. Together they had a daughter and two sons:

- Charles Cary Rumsey Jr. (1911–2007), who was married to Mary Maloney, a welfare office clerk, until his death at age 95.
- Mary Averell Rumsey (1913-1989), who made her debut in 1932 at a party with over 1,100 guests.
- Bronson Harriman Rumsey (1917–1939), who died when the plane he was riding in, along with Daniel S. Roosevelt (1917–1939) (the son of Hall Roosevelt and nephew of Eleanor Roosevelt), hit a mountain slope near Guadalupe Victoria, Puebla, Mexico.

Charles was killed in a car accident in 1922. From 1933-1934, she shared a home and possibly a romantic relationship with United States Secretary of Labor Frances Perkins. Both activists, they had been friends since approximately 1910 and worked together in the Settlement Houses of New York City. Mary died in 1934, a few weeks after being severely injured in horse riding accident during a hunt near Middleburg, Virginia. Though the exact nature of their relationship is unknown, Perkins was with Rumsey's children at her bedside when she died, and was publicly recognized as one of the 'principal mourners' at her funeral.
