= Gladys Fries Harriman =

American philanthropist, equestrian and big game hunter

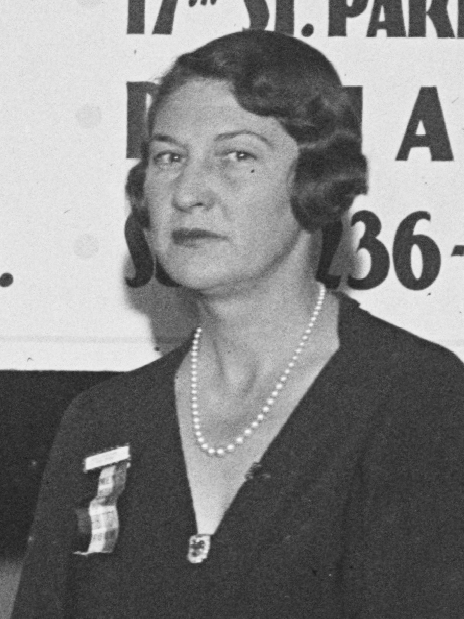
- Harriman in 1932
- Born: Gladys Fries; 1896; New York City
- Died: 1983 (aged 86–87); Arden, New York
- Occupations: Philanthropist, equestrian, big game hunter
- Spouse: E. Roland Harriman (m. 1917; died 1978)
- Children: 2

Gladys Fries Harriman (1896–1983) was an American philanthropist, equestrian and big game hunter. She was an executive at the American Red Cross. She became one of the first female equestrian drivers and big game hunters.

== Early life ==
Harriman was born in 1896 in New York City. She was the daughter of Dr. Harold Fries and Catherine Cahill. Her father was a chemist with business concerns in the South.

== Career ==
She was a competitive driver and trotter of standardbred horses, winning many medals for it. In 1929, she became the first female two-minute driver when she drove Highland Scott over a mile in two minutes in Goshen, New York.

She was one of the earliest female big game hunter. She often hunted deer near her estate in Arden, New York state. In the 1930s, she went goat hunting near the Salmon River in Idaho and in the Rocky Mountains of Wyoming with her husband. She went grouse-hunting in Scotland in 1934. She also went chamois-hunting in the Austrian Alps. In 1937, she went bighorn sheep-hunting near Crystal Creek in Wyoming. She then went caribou-hunting in British Columbia, Canada in 1938. She later published non-fiction books about her big game hunting experiences.

=== Philanthropy ===
She began supporting the American Red Cross in the 1920s. During World War II, she became an executive for the Red Cross, serving as Chairman of Volunteer Services of its New York branch.

== Personal life ==
On April 12, 1917, she married the banker Edward Roland Harriman (1895–1978), the younger brother of New York Governor W. Averell Harriman (1891–1986). The Harriman brothers were the sons of railroad baron Edward Henry Harriman and his wife, Mary Williamson Averell. Together, Gladys and Harriman had two daughters:

- Elizabeth Harriman, who was married to Alexander C. Northrop, then Maximillian Bliss, Jr.
- Phyllis Harriman, a landscape painter, who was married for several years to fellow artist Frank Herbert Mason (1921–2009)

They resided in Arden, New York. They were listed in the Social Register.

Her husband predeceased her on February 16, 1978. She died in 1983, both in Arden, New York.
