= Mary Williamson Harriman =

American philanthropist (1851–1932)

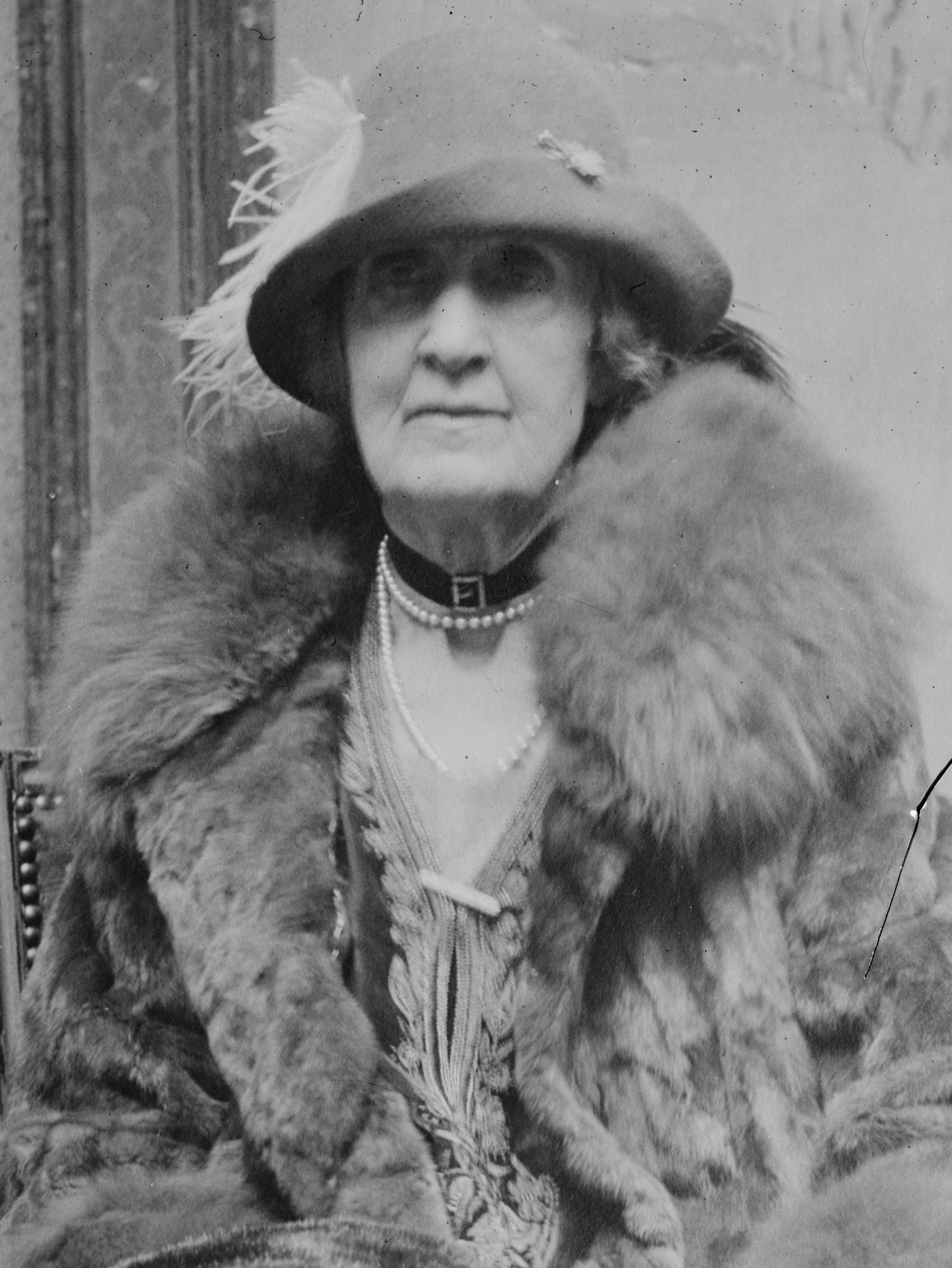
- Harriman c. 1927
- Born: Mary Williamson Averell; July 22, 1851; New York City, NY, United States
- Died: November 7, 1932 (aged 81); Washington, D.C., United States
- Spouse: E. H. Harriman (m. 1879; died 1909)
- Children: Mary Harriman Rumsey; Henry Neilson Harriman; Cornelia Harriman Gerry; Carol A. Harriman; William Averell Harriman; Edward Roland Noel Harriman

Mary Williamson Averell Harriman (July 22, 1851 – November 7, 1932) was an American philanthropist and the wife of railroad executive E. H. Harriman. Born in New York to a successful family, Averell married Harriman in 1879. Averell's father introduced E. H. Harriman to the railroad business. After his death, Mary was left with $70 to $100 million. She became dedicated to philanthropy, donating the land that became Harriman State Park and largely funding the development of the controversial Eugenics Record Office. Averell had several children; her son, W. Averell Harriman became governor of New York and her daughter Mary Harriman Rumsey founded the Junior League.

== Early life ==
Mary Williamson Averell was born on July 22, 1851, in New York City. She was tutored at home and completed her education at a finishing school with the "expectation that one day she would become a fine wife and mother for some young man of equal or greater social standing than the Averells." Mary's father, William J. Averell, was a successful New York banker and president of the Ogdensburg and Lake Champlain Railroad.

== Adulthood ==
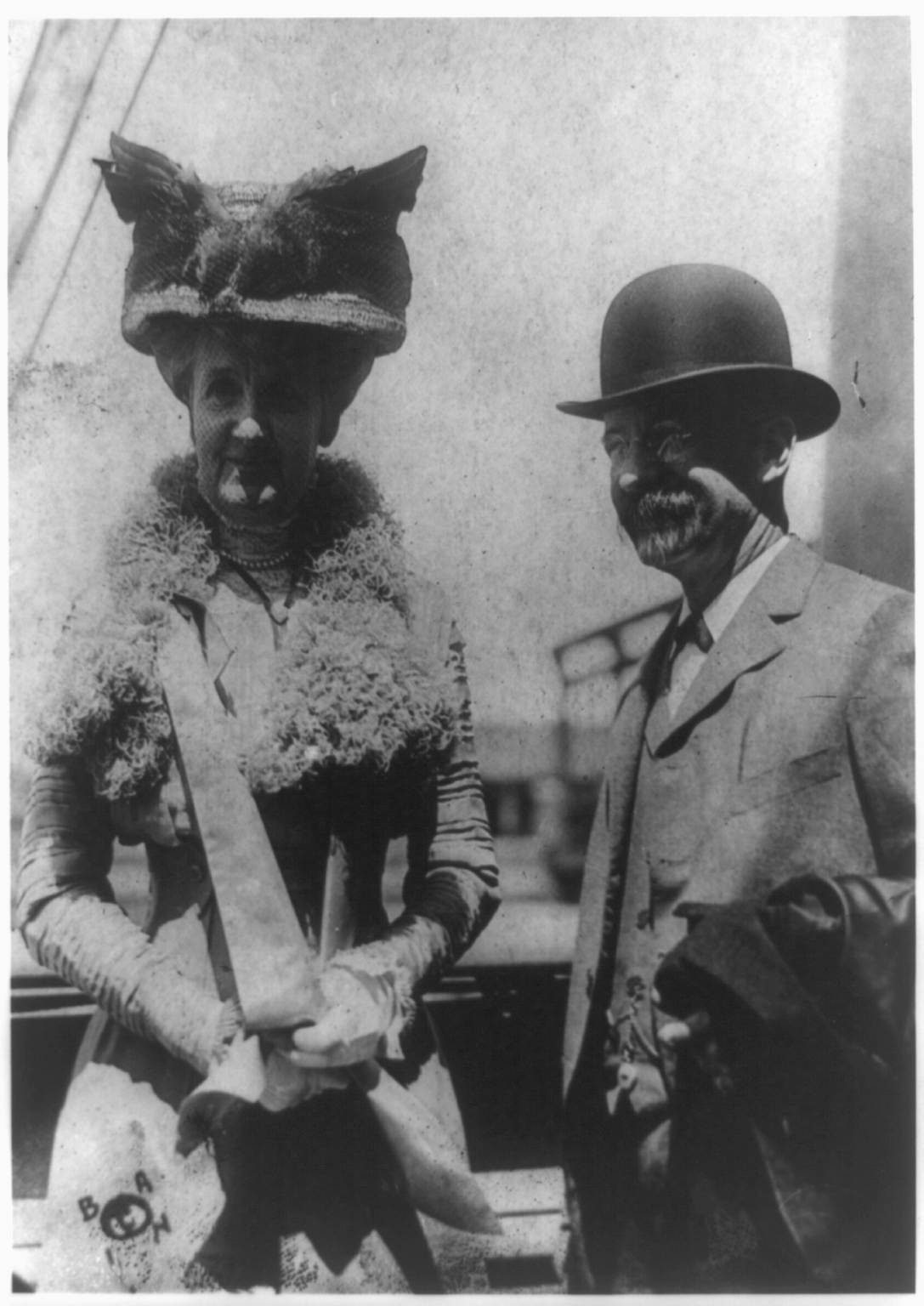
Harriman and her husband, c. 1909

In Averell's late twenties, she met 31-year-old Edward Henry Harriman, a rising stockbroker and businessman, whom she married on August 10, 1879. After her marriage, her father offered her husband a seat on his railroad's board, which led to a career in railroads and an extraordinary fortune. In 1886, that fortune allowed E. H. to purchase 7,863 acres (31.82 km^{2}) of heavily forested land on the western shore of the Hudson River at Highland Falls in New York; this was expanded to 20,000 acres (81 km^{2}) within two years by the purchase of 40 additional properties. The estate, named Arden, came to include dairying, horse breeding and mining. As one of his neighbors put it, "He collects mountains as other men collect china."

By the start of the 20th century, lumbering and quarries were beginning to encroach on the tranquility of the region. When, in 1909, the state of New York acquired a parcel of land at Bear Mountain to build a new prison, Harriman approached New York Governor Charles Evans Hughes with a proposal to extend the Palisades Interstate Park with a donation of thousands of acres and one million dollars as an endowment for its management if the governor would agree to locate the prison somewhere else. In September 1909, E.H. Harriman died, but the offer was ultimately accepted, and Mary and her son Averell completed the gift.

== Later life and philanthropy ==
After her husband's death in 1909, Harriman continued to manage her considerable empire, valued between $70 and $100 million (equivalent to $3,499,630,000 in 2024). As one commentator noted, her "lifelong interest in philanthropy was about to become a profession." One of her first undertakings was to fulfill E.H.'s vision of an immense state park. In 1910, Mary donated 10,000 acres (40 km^{2}) of the Arden estate to the State of New York, leading to the creation of Harriman State Park as an extension of the Palisades Interstate Park, along with the $1 million (equivalent to $33,746,000 in 2024) endowment for its management. She made it conditional upon others contributing $1.5 million (equivalent to $50,620,000 in 2024) and the State of New York matching these funds with an added $2.5 million (equivalent to $84,366,000 in 2024). She received the National Institute of Social Sciences Gold Medal in 1925 and the Pugsley Gold Medal in 1929 "...for her services in the establishment of the Palisades Interstate Park."

This was to be the start of a life dedicated to philanthropy. Monies were contributed to The Boys' Club of New York that E.H. loved and supported, to the American Red Cross, to John Muir to help save the Yosemite Valley and to Yale University for an endowed chair of Forestry. She also supported a number of artists, including especially sculptor Malvina Hoffman, whose bust of Harriman is still on display in Arden House.

In her married years Harriman was a strong, silent, and supportive wife. After her husband's death, she became a leader in American philanthropy, donating her personal and private resources to improve the world around her. As part of this philanthropy, she gave over a half-million dollars to the Eugenics Record Office, an organisation which promoted racist, unethical and discriminatory policies such as forced sterilisation of racially or medically "inferior" people, upon the encouragement of her friend David Starr Jordan. In 1913, she created the E. H. Harriman Award in her late husband's honor to recognize outstanding achievements in railway safety; the award is still presented on an annual basis today.

== Personal life ==
The Harrimans had six children:

- Mary Harriman (1881–1934), who in 1901, as a 19-year-old New York City debutante, formed the Junior League. Mary married Charles Cary Rumsey (1879–1922), sculptor and polo player
- Henry Neilson Harriman (1883-1888)
- Cornelia Harriman (1884–1966)
- Carol Harriman (1889-1948)
- William Averell Harriman (1891–1986), who in 1955 became the Governor of New York. He married Kitty Lanier Lawrence, then Marie Norton Whitney, and lastly Pamela Beryl Digby Churchill Hayward
- Edward Roland Noel Harriman (1895–1978), who married Gladys Fries (1896–1983)

Mary W. Harriman died on November 7, 1932, in Manhattan, New York.
