= Frank Herbert Mason =

American painter

- Born: February 20, 1921; Cleveland, Ohio, U.S.
- Died: June 16, 2009 (aged 88); Arden, New York, U.S.
- Education: Music and Arts High School; Art Students League of New York
- Occupations: Painter, teacher
- Spouse: Phyllis Harriman Mason
- Children: Arden Harriman Mason
- Relatives: E. Roland Harriman (father-in-law); Gladys Fries Harriman (mother-in-law)

Frank Herbert Mason (February 20, 1921 – June 16, 2009) was an American painter and teacher.

== Early life ==
Frank Herbert Mason was born on February 20, 1921, in Cleveland, Ohio. His father was a Shakespearean actor and his mother was a violinist and a pianist. He attended the Music and Arts High School in New York City until he was awarded a scholarship to study at the Art Students League of New York with Frank DuMond.

== Career ==
In 1951, he began teaching at the Art Students League.

His painting, the Resurrection of Christ, can be seen in Old St. Patrick's Cathedral in New York City. In 1962, he received a commission to paint eight large paintings of the Life of St. Anthony of Padua, which were permanently installed in the 11th-century Church of San Giovanni de Malta, in Venice, where his paintings hang alongside a painting by Giovanni Bellini. Consequently, the Order of Malta conferred upon him the Cross of Merit, Prima Classe. He became the first painter to receive the honor since Caravaggio.

In response to the overcleaning of the Sistine Chapel, Mason, along with James Beck, professor of art history at Columbia University, helped form the organization, ArtWatch International.

Mason served as president of the National Society of Mural Painters for the 1995–96 year.

== Personal life ==
He married Phyllis Harriman, the daughter of banker E. Roland Harriman and philanthropist Gladys Fries Harriman. Together, they had:

- Arden Harriman Mason, and artist and musician

Mason died in 2009.

=== Legacy ===
A full-length documentary film produced by Maestro Films premiered at the Big Apple Film Festival in New York City on November 3, 2011.
