= 1958 New York gubernatorial election =

- November 4, 1958
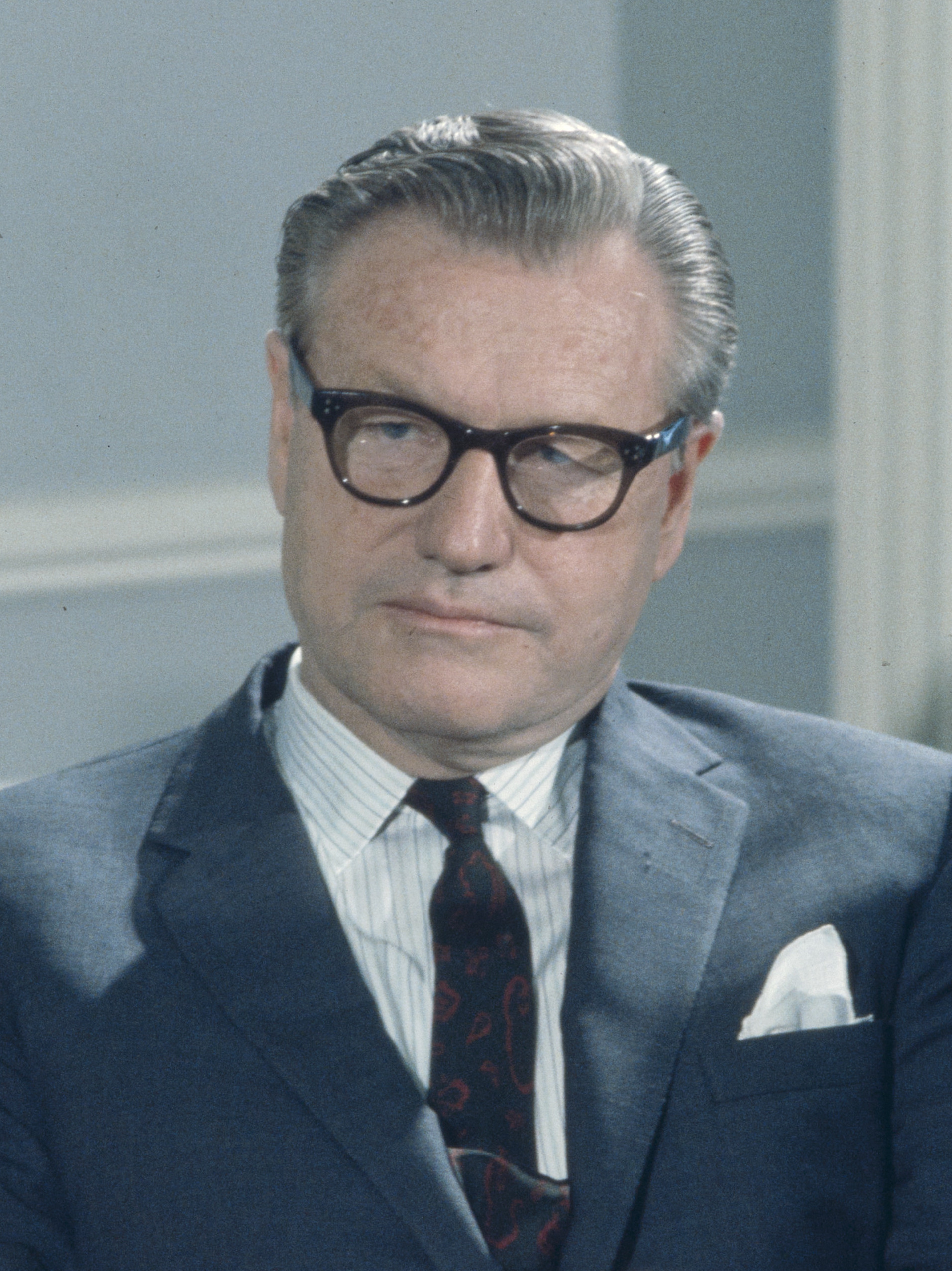

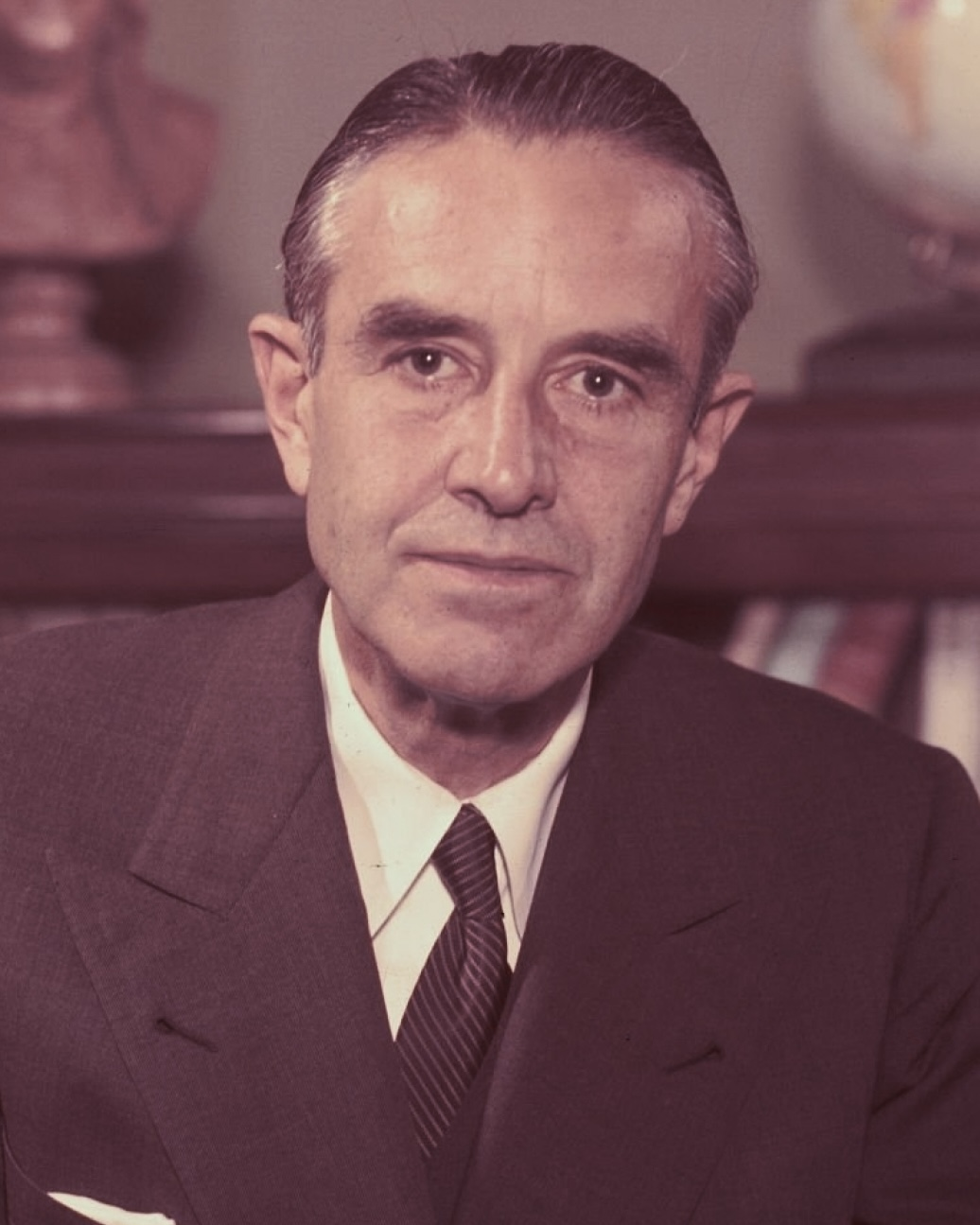
Nominee	Nelson Rockefeller	W. Averell Harriman
Party	Republican	Democratic
Alliance		Liberal
Running mate	Malcolm Wilson	George DeLuca
Popular vote	3,126,929	2,553,895
Percentage	54.74%	44.71%
- County results Rockefeller: 50–60% 60–70% 70–80% Harriman: 50–60% 60–70%
Governor before election
W. Averell Harriman
Democratic
Elected Governor
Nelson Rockefeller
Republican

The 1958 New York gubernatorial election was held on November 8, 1958, to elect the Governor and Lieutenant Governor of New York. Incumbent Democratic governor W. Averell Harriman ran for re-election to a second term in office but was defeated by Republican Nelson Rockefeller.

== General election ==
=== Candidates ===
- W. Averell Harriman, incumbent Governor since 1955 (Democratic and Liberal)
- John T. McManus, journalist (Independent-Socialist)
- Nelson Rockefeller, foreign policy advisor to President Dwight D. Eisenhower and member of the Rockefeller family (Republican)

=== Results ===
1958 New York gubernatorial election
Party	Candidate	Votes	%	±%
Republican	Nelson Rockefeller	3,126,929	54.74%	▲5.74
Democratic	W. Averell Harriman (incumbent)	2,269,969	39.74%	▼4.47
Liberal	W. Averell Harriman (incumbent)	283,926	4.97%	▼0.83
Total	W. Averell Harriman (incumbent)	2,553,895	44.71%	▼5.30
Independent-Socialist	John T. McManus	31,658	0.55%	▼0.45
Total votes		5,712,482	100.00%	

== Works cited ==
- Benjamin, Gerald; Catalano, Michael (2020). Beyond Donkeys and Elephants: Minor Political Parties in Contemporary American Politics. University Press of Kansas. doi:10.2307/j.ctv15tt76n. ISBN 978-0-7006-2929-9.
- Soyer, Daniel (2021). Left in the Center: The Liberal Party of New York and the Rise and Fall of American Social Democracy. Cornell University Press. ISBN 9781501759888. JSTOR 10.7591/j.ctv1hw3x50.2.
