= E. Roland Harriman =

American financier and philanthropist

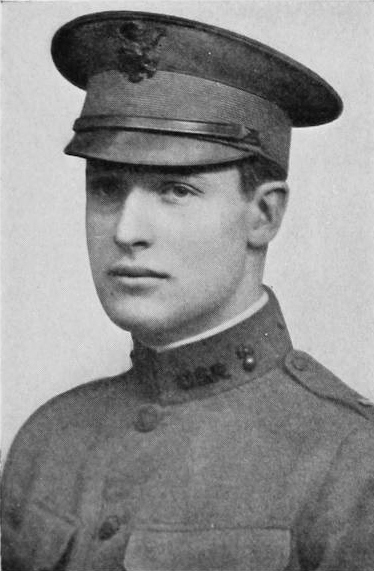
- Harriman during World War I service
- Born: Edward Roland Noel Harriman; December 24, 1895; New York City, U.S.
- Died: February 16, 1978 (aged 82); Arden, New York, U.S.
- Education: Groton School; Yale University
- Occupations: Businessman, philanthropist
- Spouse: Gladys Fries Harriman
- Children: 2
- Parent(s): E. H. Harriman; Mary Williamson
- Relatives: Mary Harriman (sister); W. Averell Harriman (brother)

Edward Roland Noel "Bunny" Harriman (December 24, 1895 – February 16, 1978) was an American financier, philanthropist and heir of the wealthy Harriman family.

== Early life ==
Harriman was born on December 24, 1895, in New York City. He was the youngest of five surviving children of Mary Williamson Averell and Edward Henry Harriman. Among his siblings was W. Averell Harriman, the financier and government official, four years his senior. Edward H. Harriman's estate was substantial, variously estimated between $70 million and $100 million upon his death in 1909, leaving his wife and children well provided for.

Roland, whom friends and family sometimes called "Bunny", was educated at Groton School, from which he graduated in 1913, and Yale University (B.A., 1917), where he was a member of Psi Upsilon fraternity. He was also a member of Skull and Bones with his classmate and friend Prescott Bush. During World War I he served for 10 months as an inspector with the rank of lieutenant in the United States Army Ordnance Department; stricken with pneumonia and influenza, he was honorably discharged in January 1919.

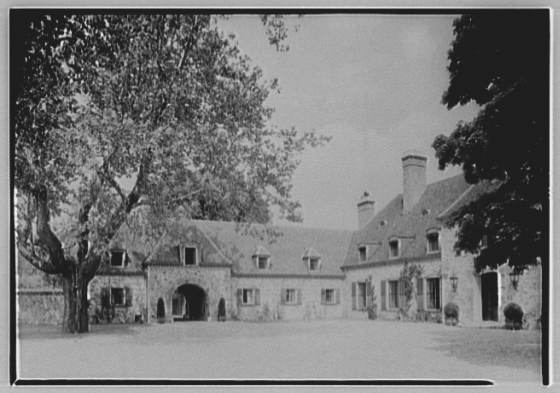
E. Roland Harriman, residence in Arden, New York.

== Career ==
After regaining his health in California, in November 1919, Harriman joined the Merchant Shipbuilding Corporation, a firm in which his brother W. Averell Harriman had an interest.

In 1922 Harriman joined W. A. Harriman Company, investment bankers in New York City, and in 1923 he became its vice president. In 1927 the two brothers formed the banking firm Harriman Brothers and Company. In 1931 the firm was merged with Brown Bros. & Co., with Roland as vice president. Headquartered on Wall Street, Brown Brothers Harriman started with nine partners and about 200 employees, performing specialized banking services for customers, mainly medium-sized corporations; it was not a member of the Federal Reserve System or the Federal Deposit Insurance Corporation.

In 1968 Harriman and three other senior partners at Brown Brothers (Robert A. Lovett, secretary of defense under President Harry Truman; Prescott Bush, former senator from Connecticut; and Knight Woolley — all Yale men) moved "upstairs", literally and figuratively, to make way for the younger partners, one of whom was Robert Roosa, former undersecretary of the U.S. Treasury. In 1975 a few years prior to Harriman's death, there were 29 partners and approximately 1,000 employees.

Harriman served as the chairman of the Union Pacific Railroad for 23 years.

=== Union Bank ===
Harriman was one of the seven directors of the Union Banking Corporation (along with Prescott Sheldon Bush, father of future U.S. president George H. W. Bush), which financed Fritz Thyssen, a donor to the Nazi Party and whose assets were seized by the United States government during World War II under the Trading with the Enemy Act and Executive Order No. 9095.

== Personal life ==
On April 12, 1917, he married Gladys Fries (1896–1983). They resided in Arden, New York and were listed in the Social Register. Together they had two children:

- Elizabeth Harriman, who was married to Alexander C. Northrop, then Maximillian Bliss, Jr.
- Phyllis Harriman, a landscape painter, who was married for several years to fellow artist Frank Herbert Mason

Harriman died on February 16, 1978, in Arden, New York, and his wife died in 1983, also in Arden, New York.

=== Philanthropy ===
With his wife, Harriman established the Irving Sherwood Wright professorship in geriatrics at New York Hospital-Cornell Medical Center, and provided funds for cardiovascular research at the hospital.

After World War II, Harriman joined the American Red Cross as a member of the board of governors in 1947 and helped reorganize it, serving as manager for the organization's North Atlantic area from 1944 to 1946, as vice-president and national annual fund appeal chair in 1949, and was appointed its president by President Truman to succeed General George Marshall in 1950. President Dwight Eisenhower reappointed him president in 1953.

Harriman's other philanthropic board memberships included that of the American Museum of Natural History, for which he was also treasurer. He was also the chairman of the U.S. Trotting Association. He was also president and chairman of the Boys' Club of New York.

== Bibliography ==
- I Reminisce (1975).
