= Stuyvesant =

Stuyvesant may refer to:

== People ==
- Stuyvesant family
- Peter Stuyvesant (1592–1672), the last governor of New Netherland
- Peter Stuyvesant (1727–1805), New York landowner and merchant
- Peter Gerard Stuyvesant (1778–1847), lawyer, landowner and philanthropist.
- Rutherfurd Stuyvesant (1843–1909), socialite and land developer
- Stuyvesant Fish (1851–1923), American businessman

== Places ==
- Stuyvesant, New York, a town in Columbia County, New York, United States
- Stuyvesant Street, a street in Manhattan
- Stuyvesant Square, a park in Manhattan, and the surrounding neighborhood
- Stuyvesant Heights, Brooklyn
- Bedford–Stuyvesant, Brooklyn
- Stuyvesant Town–Peter Cooper Village
- Stuyvesant Apartments
- Stuyvesant High School, a high school in Manhattan

== Other ==
- Peter Stuyvesant (cigarette), a cigarette brand by British American Tobacco
- Stuyvesant Handicap, American Thoroughbred horse race
- Marcus Stuyvesant, one of Agent 47's targets in Dubai in Hitman 3
