= John C. White =

John C. White may refer to:

- John Campbell White (disambiguation)
  - John Campbell White, 1st Baron Overtoun (1843–1908), Scottish chemicals manufacturer
  - John Campbell White (Irish politician) (died 1923), High Sheriff of Belfast and Lord Mayor of Belfast
  - John Campbell White (diplomat) (1884–1967), American diplomat, US ambassador to Haiti and Peru
- John Coyle White (1924–1995), American politician from Texas
- John White (Louisiana politician) (born 1975), American politician from Louisiana
