= John Campbell White (diplomat) =

American diplomat

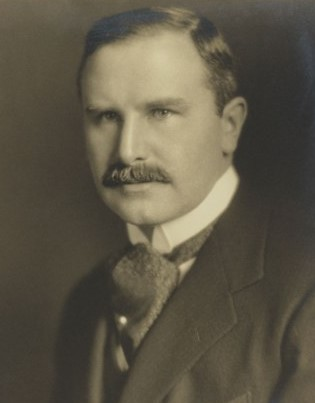

United States Ambassador to Peru
- In office April 4, 1944 – June 17, 1945
- President: Franklin D. Roosevelt
- Preceded by: Raymond Henry Norweb
- Succeeded by: William D. Pawley

United States Ambassador to Haiti
- In office March 14, 1941 – February 24, 1944
- President: Franklin D. Roosevelt
- Preceded by: Ferdinand L. Mayer
- Succeeded by: Orme Wilson

Personal details
- Born: March 17, 1884 London, England
- Died: June 11, 1967 (aged 83) New York City, U.S.
- Spouse: Elizabeth Barclay Moffat (m. 1921)
- Children: Margaret Rutherfurd White
- Parent(s): Henry White; Margaret Stuyvesant Rutherfurd
- Education: Harvard University

John Campbell White (March 17, 1884 – June 11, 1967) was a prominent United States diplomat who served as United States Ambassador to Haiti (1941–1944) and Peru (1944–1945).

== Early life ==
Portrait of White's mother, Margaret Stuyvesant Rutherfurd, by John Singer Sargent, 1883

White was born at the American Legation in London on March 17, 1884. He was the son of Henry White (1850–1927) and Margaret Stuyvesant Rutherfurd (1853–1916). His father was a diplomat during the 1890s and 1900s who served as United States Ambassador to France and Italy, and one of the signers of the Treaty of Versailles. His only sibling was Margaret Muriel White (1880–1943), who married Count Ernst Hans Christoph Roger Hermann Seherr-Thoss, a Prussian aristocrat in 1909. After his mother's death, his father remarried to Emily Vanderbilt Sloane (1852–1946) in 1920. His stepmother was the daughter of William Henry Vanderbilt (1821–1885) and the granddaughter of Cornelius Vanderbilt (1794–1877).

His paternal grandparents were John Campbell White and Eliza Ridgely. They family was wealthy and socially well-connected in Maryland where, as a boy, his father was taken to meet then-President Franklin Pierce and spent much of his childhood at Hampton, the family estate which today is run by the National Park Service. His maternal grandparents were Lewis Morris Rutherfurd (1816–1892), the lawyer and pioneering astrophotographer, and Margaret Stuyvesant Chanler (1820–1890). Through his mother, his uncle was Stuyvesant Rutherfurd and another uncle was Winthrop Rutherfurd.

White graduated from Harvard University in 1907.

== Career ==
White served in the U.S. Foreign Service as a diplomat from 1914 to 1945. In 1932, he was the counselor of the American Embassy in Buenos Aires, Argentina. In 1933, White, who was then Chargé d'affaires in Buenos Aires, was licensed as a third-class international pilot in the country.

On June 19, 1940, he was appointed Diplomatic Agent/Consul General to Morocco. He presented his credentials on August 14, 1940 and left his post on January 6, 1941. On November 29, 1940, he was appointed Envoy Extraordinary and Minister Plenipotentiary to Haiti, beginning his service on March 14, 1941. On April 14, 1943, the legation was upgraded to an Embassy and he became the United States Ambassador to Haiti, serving until February 24, 1944.

On January 29, 1944, he was appointed the United States Ambassador to Peru, beginning his service on April 4, 1944 and serving until June 17, 1945 when he left his post.

== Personal life ==
In 1921, White was married to Elizabeth Barclay Moffat (1898–1993) at St. James' Church on Madison Avenue and 71st Street. Elizabeth, a graduate of Miss Chapin's School in Manhattan, was the daughter of Reuben Burnham Moffat and Ellen Low (née Pierrepont) Moffat and the sister of Jay Pierrepont Moffat, the U.S. Ambassador to Canada, and Abbot Low Moffat, a member of the New York State Assembly. Together, they were the parents of:

- Margaret Rutherfurd White, who married William Tapley Bennett Jr. (1917–1994), the U.S. Ambassador to the Dominican Republic, Portugal, and NATO, in 1945.

White died at the age of 83 at his residence, 760 Park Avenue in New York City, on June 11, 1967.

=== Descendants ===
Through his daughter Margaret, he was the grandfather of five, William Tapley Bennett III of Washington, D.C., U.S. Navy Cmdr. John Campbell White Bennett of Charleston, South Carolina, Anne B. Bennett of Lexington, Massachusetts, Ellen Bennett Godsall of London, and Victoria R. Bennett of Seattle, Washington.

Diplomatic posts
Preceded by Raymond Henry Norweb	U.S. Ambassador to Peru; 1941–1944	Succeeded by William D. Pawley
Preceded by Ferdinand L. Mayer	U.S. Ambassador to Haiti; 1944–1945	Succeeded by Orme Wilson
