= Mathilde Stuyvesant =

French heiress and society leader

Mathilde Elizabeth Stuyvesant
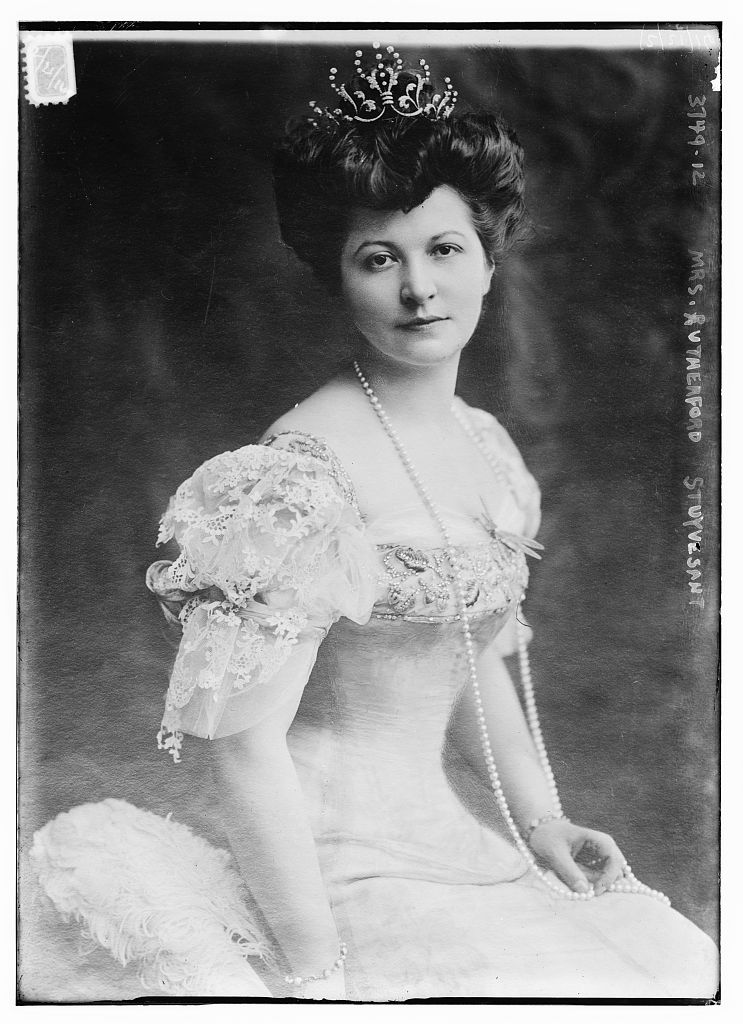
- Photograph of Mrs. Stuyvesant, c. 1915–1920.
- Born: Mathilde Gisele Elizabeth Löwenguth; 29 November 1877; Strasbourg, Alsace, Germany
- Died: 10 July 1948 (aged 70); New York City, U.S.
- Spouses: Count Willem Lodewijk Worbert van Wassenaer (m. 1895; div. 1900) Rutherfurd Stuyvesant (m. 1902; died 1909) Prince Alexandre de Caraman-Chimay (m. 1933)
- Children: 2

Mathilde, Princess Alexandre de Caraman Chimay (née Mathilde Gisele Elizabeth Löwenguth, formerly the Countess de Wassenaer and Mrs. Rutherfurd Stuyvesant) (29 November 1877 – 10 July 1948) was a French heiress and society leader who is known for her three marriages to wealthy and prominent men– a Dutch Count, an American heir, and a Belgian Prince.

== Early life ==
Mathilde Gisele Elizabeth Löwenguth was born on 29 November 1877 in Strasbourg, Alsace, France. She was a daughter of Joseph Löwenguth (or Loewenguth) and the former Rosalie Humbert.

== Personal life ==
Mathilde was married three times. Her first marriage was in Paris to a Willem Lodewijk Worbert, Graaf van Wassenaer on 26 July 1895. He was born in Florence, Italy, and was a son of Willem Lodewijk Worbert van Wassenaer and Maria Catharina Frederika van Rechteren-Limpurg. Although most contemporary newspapers referred to her as a widow, she was actually divorced from her first husband around the year 1900. He actually outlived her second husband and died in Bathmen, Netherlands, on 23 August 1913.

=== Second marriage ===
On 16 June 1902, she remarried to Rutherfurd Stuyvesant at St. George's Chapel on Albemarle Street in London. The American Stuyvesant was a son of the lawyer and well-known astronomer Lewis Morris Rutherfurd and, his wife, Margaret Stuyvesant (née Chanler) Rutherfurd (the niece and adopted daughter of Peter Gerard Stuyvesant) and was a direct descendant of Peter Stuyvesant, the last Dutch Director-General of New Amsterdam in 1664. His first wife, the former Mary Pierrepont (a granddaughter of Peter Augustus Jay), had died, along with their son, during childbirth in 1879. Together, Mathilde and Rutherfurd lived primarily in New York (at 246 East 15th Street opposite Stuyvesant Square), at their country estate known as Tranquility Farms (near Hackettstown, New Jersey) and abroad where she owned a villa in the South of France. They were the parents of two sons:

- Lewis Rutherfurd Stuyvesant (1903–1944), who married Rosalie Stuyvesant Pillot in 1925, daughter of Peter Stuyvesant Pillot. The couple had one child, Peter Winthrop Rutherfurd Stuyvesant (1935–1970), before they divorced in 1930. He later married Elizabeth (née Larocque) Smith in 1934. She was the former wife of Schuyler Knowlton Smith and the daughter of Joseph Laroque.
- Alan Rutherfurd Stuyvesant (1905–1954), who did not marry. He was injured in a car accident in 1934. He died aboard a ship just short of arriving at their destination to France.

Her second husband Rutherfurd died suddenly while out for his customary morning walk in the Champs-Élysées in Paris on 4 July 1909. His body was sent back to the United States for burial.

=== Third marriage ===
After his death, she lived in Paris for several years, and was active in American charities in France during World War I. On 18 August 1933, she married for the third time to Belgian Prince Alexandre de Caraman-Chimay (1873–1951). Prince Alexandre was a son of Joseph de Caraman-Chimay, 18th Prince de Chimay and brother of Élisabeth, Countess Greffulhe and Joseph, Prince de Caraman-Chimay (married to American heiress Clara Ward). His first wife was Catherine Hélène, Princess Bassaraba de Brancovan (a daughter of Prince Grégoire), who died in Paris in 1929, and was the mother of his only child, Prince Marc-Adolphe de Caraman-Chimay (1903–1992).

The Princess Alexandre de Caraman Chimay died on 10 July 1948 at her home, 1170 Fifth Avenue in New York City. She was buried in the Stuyvesant family plot at Tranquility Cemetery, New Jersey. Her wealth was held in trust for her children and grandson.
