= This I Remember =

1949 memoir by Eleanor Roosevelt

- First edition (1949)
- Author: Eleanor Roosevelt
- Publisher: Harper & Brothers
- Publication date: 1949
- Pages: 387

This I Remember is a 1949 memoir by Eleanor Roosevelt, an American political figure, diplomat, activist and First Lady of the United States while her husband, Franklin D. Roosevelt, was President of the United States. This I Remember was one of four memoirs written by Roosevelt, the other three being: This Is My Story, On My Own, and The Autobiography of Eleanor Roosevelt. It was received well by critics and was a commercial success.

== Background ==
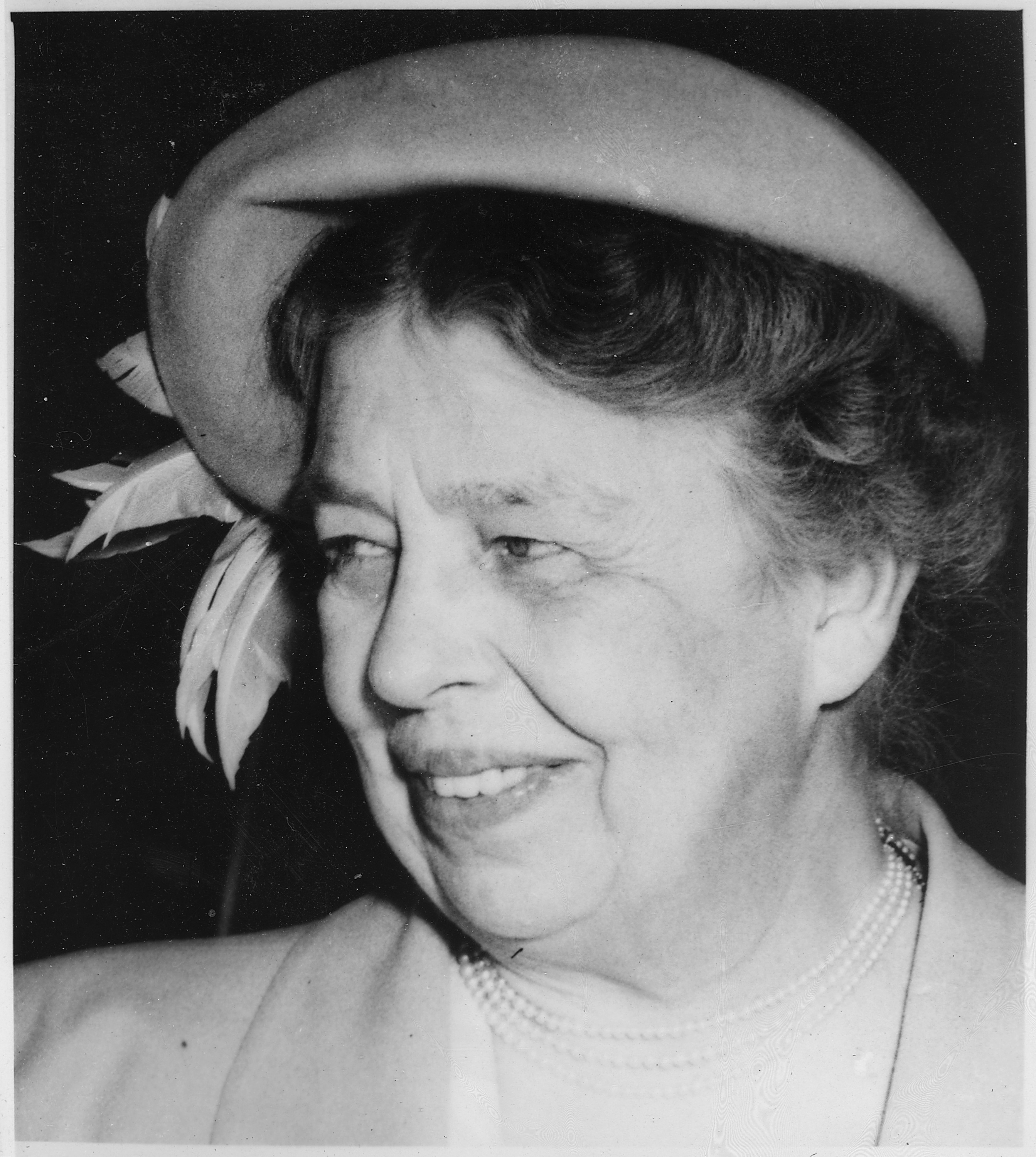
Roosevelt in 1949

Eleanor Roosevelt was born on October 11, 1884, in New York City. A member of the prominent Roosevelt family, she grew up surrounded by material wealth, but had a difficult childhood, suffering the deaths of both of her parents and a brother before she was ten. Roosevelt was sent by relatives to the Allenswood School five years later. While there, Marie Souvestre, the founder of the school, influenced her. She wrote in This is My Story that "Whatever I have become had its seeds in those three years of contact with a liberal mind and strong personality." When she was eighteen, Roosevelt returned to New York and joined the National Consumers League. She married Franklin D. Roosevelt, her cousin, in 1905. They would have five children.

Eleanor was involved in her husband's political career as he won a seat in the New York State Senate in 1911 and traveled with him to Washington D.C. when he was made United States Secretary of War in Woodrow Wilson's cabinet. She became involved in volunteer work during World War I. In 1918, she discovered that Franklin was having an affair with Lucy Mercer Rutherfurd and resolved to develop her own life. She continued to help her husband in his political career but also began working in various reform movements, including the women's suffrage movement. As First Lady of the United States following Franklin's election as President of the United States in 1932, Eleanor "set the standard against which president's wives have been measured ever since", working to create opportunities for women, the establishment of the National Youth Administration, and championing civil rights for African-Americans. While Franklin was president she wrote 2,500 newspaper columns, 299 magazine articles, 6 books, and traveled around the country giving speeches.

Eleanor remained politically active after her husband's death, serving as the first United States Representative to the United Nations and chairing the United Nations Commission on Human Rights when the Universal Declaration of Human Rights was drafted. She later chaired John F. Kennedy's Presidential Commission on the Status of Women before her death in 1962. The American National Biography concludes that she was "perhaps the most influential American woman of the twentieth century".

== Writing and publication ==
This I Remember picked up where This Is My Story left off, in the 1920s. It covered Eleanor's life up to Franklin's death in 1945. She signed a contract to write the book shortly after he died. Cynthia Harris wrote in her biography of Eleanor that "she saw the new book as a way to shed light on FDR's legacy as much as on her own life." The manuscript was completed in 1949 and it was published in that same year by Harper & Brothers. The first edition of the book was 387 pages.

The Ladies' Home Journal had very profitably serialized her first memoir. While Eleanor offered them the rights for This I Remember, Bruce Gold, one of the editors, disliked the manuscript. He wrote that "You have written this too hastily—as though you were composing it on a bicycle while pedaling your way to a fire." She revised the memoir, but Gold was not satisfied and suggested bringing on a collaborator. In response, Eleanor left the Journal, taking it and her column to McCall's, which paid $150,000 (equivalent to $2,029,720 in 2025) —before reading the draft—for serialization rights and offered to pay her more for the column. Herbert Hoover threatened to sue the journal for Eleanor's description of his actions during the Bonus March of 1931. She apologized. The book was a Book of the Month selection.

== Reception ==
The book was described as "a tremendous critical and commercial success" in The Eleanor Roosevelt Encyclopedia. It received numerous reviews. The American Political Science Review called the book "frank and revealing" and concluded that it was a "very human account of what public life does to a man and his family." A review published in The Annals of the American Academy of Political & Social Science noted that This I Remember "is so simply told, so direct, unadorned, and sincere, that it adds greatly to our insight into the catastrophic sequence of world depression and total war." Elizabeth Janeway, writing in The New York Times wrote that

In this age of papier-mache memoirs turned out by ghost-writers at so much per yard, it is shockingly delightful to read a book which could have been written by absolutely no one else in the world than the great and important figure whose name is signed to it, which is flavorful, characteristic, and moving.

She concluded that "more than readable, this is a delightful book. If at times the style lapses in to banalities, the cliches are somehow peculiarly Mrs. Roosevelt's, warmed by her flavor."

== Bibliography ==
- Harris, Cynthia M. (2007). Eleanor Roosevelt : a biography. Westport, Conn.: Greenwood Press. ISBN 978-0-313-33166-4. OCLC 128236391.
- Beasley, Maurine Hoffman; Shulman, Holly Cowan; Beasley, Henry R.; Press, Greenwood (2001). The Eleanor Roosevelt Encyclopedia. Greenwood Publishing Group. ISBN 978-0-313-30181-0.
