= On My Own (memoir) =

1958 memoir by Eleanor Roosevelt

On My Own: The Years since the White House
- First US edition (1958)
- Author: Eleanor Roosevelt
- Publisher: Harper & Brothers
- Publication date: 1958
- Pages: 241
- OCLC: 377210
- Dewey Decimal: 920.7
- LC Class: E807.1 .R424

On My Own: The Years since the White House is a 1958 memoir by Eleanor Roosevelt, an American political figure, diplomat, activist and First Lady of the United States while her husband, Franklin D. Roosevelt, was President of the United States. On My Own was the third of four memoirs written by Roosevelt, the other three being: This Is My Story, This I Remember, and The Autobiography of Eleanor Roosevelt.

== Background ==
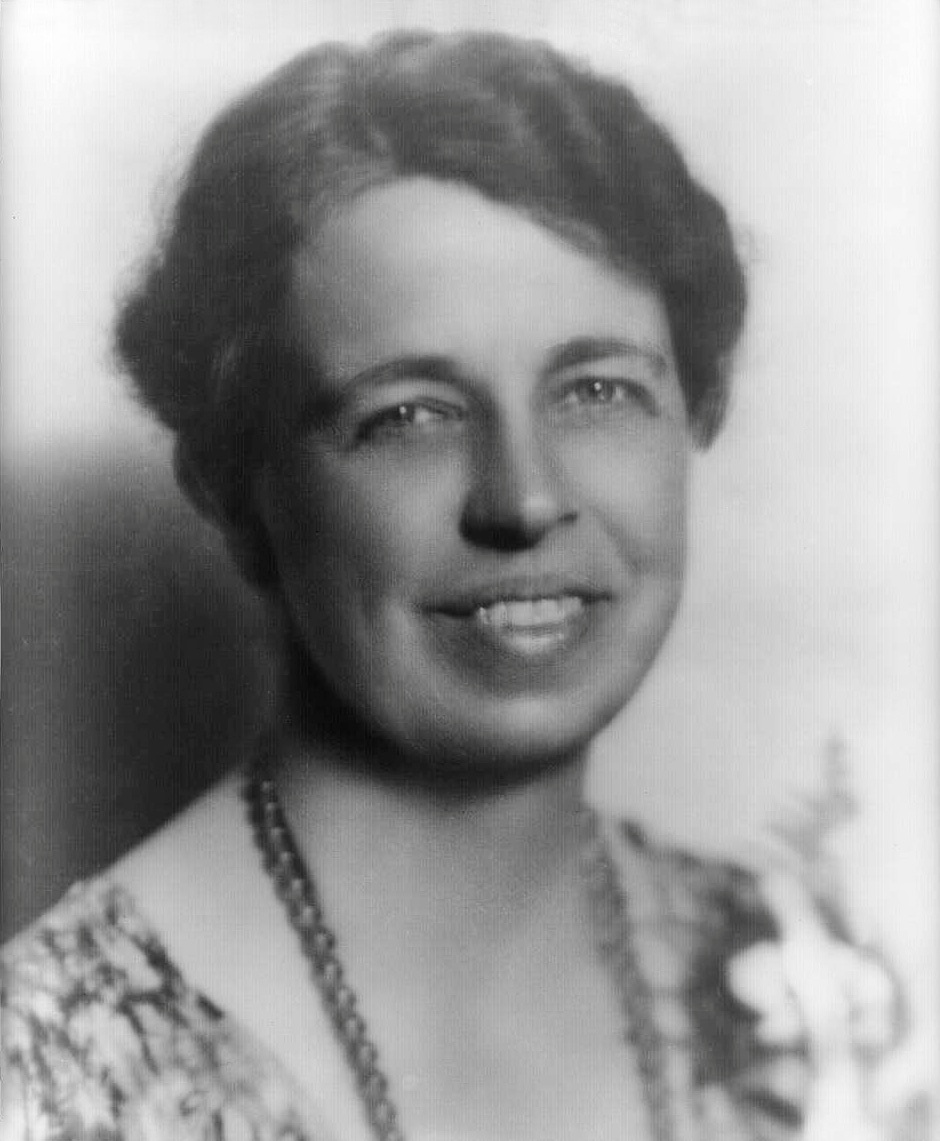
Roosevelt in 1933

Eleanor Roosevelt was born on October 11, 1884, in New York City. A member of the prominent Roosevelt family, she grew up surrounded by material wealth, but had a difficult childhood, suffering the deaths of both of her parents and a brother before she was ten. Roosevelt was sent by relatives to the Allenswood School five years later. While there, Marie Souvestre, the founder of the school, influenced her. She wrote in This is My Story that "Whatever I have become had its seeds in those three years of contact with a liberal mind and strong personality." When she was eighteen, Roosevelt returned to New York and joined the National Consumers League. She married Franklin D. Roosevelt, her cousin, in 1905. They would have five children.

Eleanor was involved in her husband's political career as he won a seat in the New York State Senate in 1911 and traveled with him to Washington D.C. when he was made United States Secretary of War in Woodrow Wilson's cabinet. She became involved in volunteer work during World War I. In 1918, she discovered that Franklin was having an affair with Lucy Mercer Rutherfurd and resolved to develop her own life. She continued to help her husband in his political career but also began working in various reform movements, including the women's suffrage movement. As First Lady of the United States following Franklin's election as President of the United States in 1932, Eleanor "set the standard against which president's wives have been measured ever since", working to create opportunities for women, the establishment of the National Youth Administration, and championing civil rights for African-Americans. While Franklin was president she wrote 2,500 newspaper columns, 299 magazine articles, 6 books, and traveled around the country giving speeches.

Eleanor remained politically active after her husband's death, serving as the first United States Representative to the United Nations and chairing the United Nations Commission on Human Rights when the Universal Declaration of Human Rights was drafted. She later chaired John F. Kennedy's Presidential Commission on the Status of Women before her death in 1962. The American National Biography concludes that she was "perhaps the most influential American woman of the twentieth century".

== Writing and publication ==
Eleanor Roosevelt's two previous memoirs, This I Remember and This Is My Story, had covered her life up to Franklin's death in 1945. On My Own was published in 1958 and covered Eleanor's life as an individual after the death of her husband. It was published by Harper & Brothers and the first edition was 241 pages.

== Reception ==
Margaret Coit, writing in The New York Times, said that the book is "most of all, Mrs. Roosevelt, warm, down-to-earth and almost over-whelmingly practical." She felt that "age has not dulled Mrs. Roosevelt's shrewd observations of her fellow-men" and concluded the book was "chatty and moving." Kirkus Reviews wrote that the book had a "random, always personal, and usually buoyant manner." A reviewer in the Richmond Times-Dispatch called her memoir "unquestionable proof" that "Mrs. Roosevelt is a remarkable figure". A review in the Kansas City Times concluded that:

for all its hopping, jumping and skipping from people to places to things "On My Own" is still a well done book. The style—somewhat unprofessional and garrulous at times, but always free of a ghostly hand—serves Mrs. Roosevelt's purposes just fine. It is not a major autobiography by any means. On the other hand, it is the autobiography of a major American.

== Bibliography ==
- Harris, Cynthia M. (2007). Eleanor Roosevelt : a biography. Westport, Conn.: Greenwood Press. ISBN 978-0-313-33166-4. OCLC 128236391.
- Beasley, Maurine Hoffman; Shulman, Holly Cowan; Beasley, Henry R.; Press, Greenwood (2001). The Eleanor Roosevelt Encyclopedia. Greenwood Publishing Group. ISBN 978-0-313-30181-0.
