= The Autobiography of Eleanor Roosevelt =

1961 autobiography of Eleanor Roosevelt

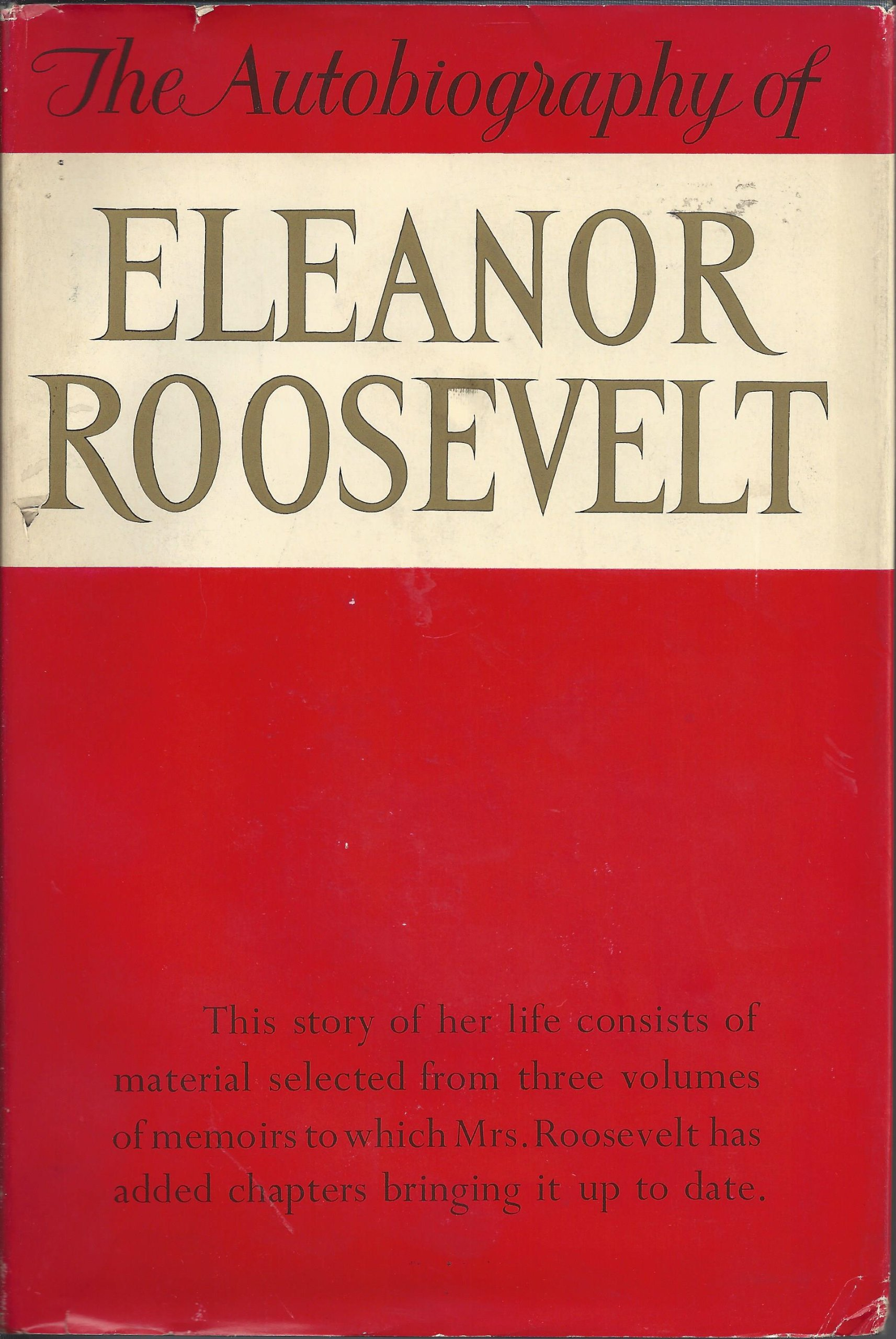
- First US edition (1961)
- Author: Eleanor Roosevelt
- Publisher: Harper & Brothers
- Publication date: 1961

The Autobiography of Eleanor Roosevelt is a 1961 memoir by Eleanor Roosevelt, an American political figure, diplomat, activist and First Lady of the United States while her husband, Franklin D. Roosevelt, was President of the United States. The Autobiography was the fourth of four memoirs written by Roosevelt, the other three being: This Is My Story (1937), This I Remember (1949), and On My Own (1958). She combined those three into The Autobiography. The book was generally well received by critics, who particularly appreciated how the combined memoirs showed Eleanor's development.

== Background ==
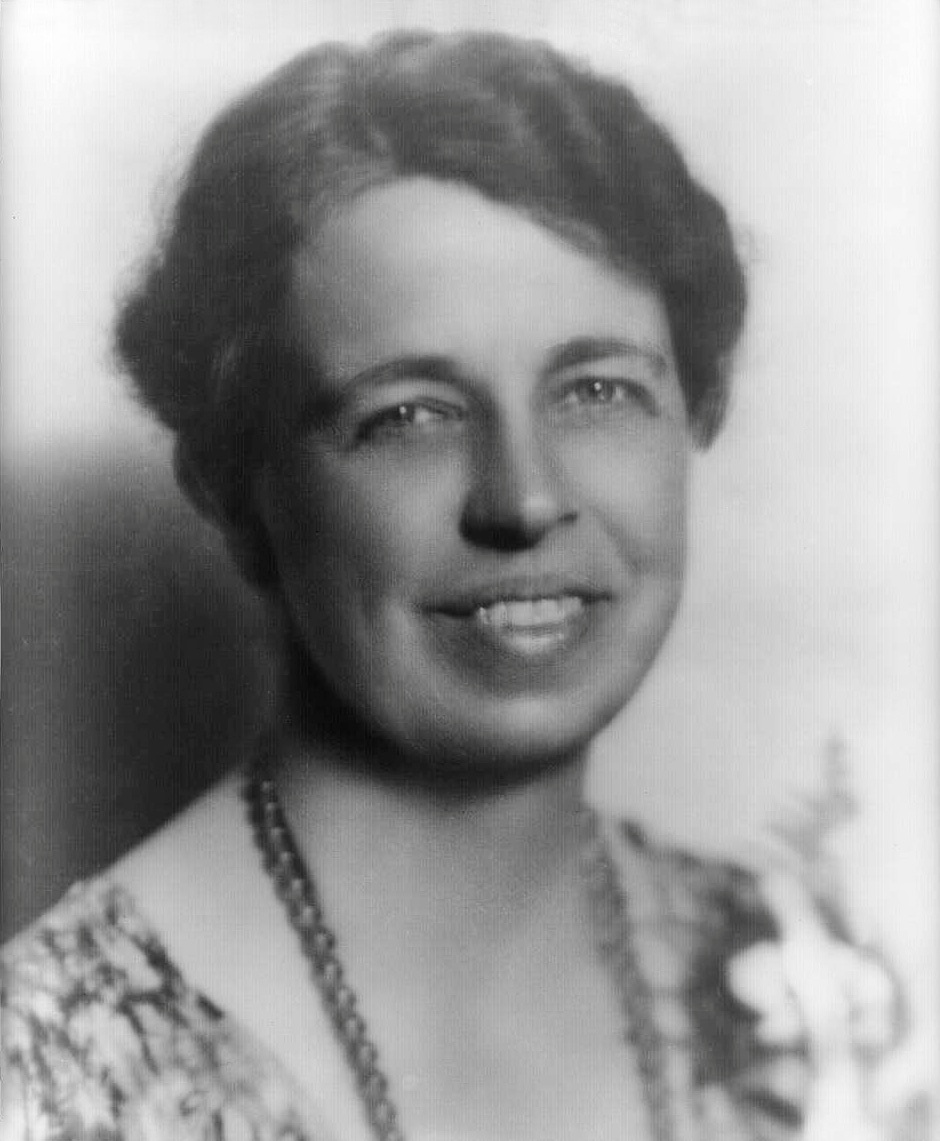
Eleanor Roosevelt in 1933

Eleanor Roosevelt was born on October 11, 1884, in New York City. A member of the prominent Roosevelt family, she grew up surrounded by material wealth, but had a difficult childhood, suffering the deaths of both of her parents and a brother before she was ten. Roosevelt was sent by relatives to the Allenswood School five years later. While there, Marie Souvestre, the founder of the school, influenced her. She wrote in This is My Story that "Whatever I have become had its seeds in those three years of contact with a liberal mind and strong personality." When she was eighteen, Roosevelt returned to New York and joined the National Consumers League. She married Franklin D. Roosevelt; her fifth cousin, once removed in 1905. They would have five children.

Eleanor was involved in her husband's political career as he won a seat in the New York State Senate in 1911 and traveled with him to Washington, D.C., when he was made United States Secretary of War in Woodrow Wilson's cabinet. She became involved in volunteer work during World War I. In 1918, she discovered that Franklin was having an affair with Lucy Mercer Rutherfurd and resolved to develop her own life. She continued to help her husband in his political career but also began working in various reform movements, including the women's suffrage movement. As First Lady of the United States following Franklin's election as President of the United States in 1932, Eleanor "set the standard against which president’s wives have been measured ever since", working to create opportunities for women, the establishment of the National Youth Administration, and championing civil rights for African-Americans. While Franklin was president she wrote 2,500 newspaper columns, 299 magazine articles, 6 books, and traveled around the country giving speeches.

Eleanor remained politically active after her husband's death, serving as the first United States Representative to the United Nations and chairing the United Nations Commission on Human Rights when the Universal Declaration of Human Rights was drafted. She later chaired John F. Kennedy's Presidential Commission on the Status of Women before her death in 1962. The American National Biography concludes that she was "perhaps the most influential American woman of the twentieth century".

== Writing and publication ==
Eleanor Roosevelt combined her three previous autobiographical memoirs, This Is My Story (1938), This I Remember (1949), and On My Own (1958) into The Autobiography of Eleanor Roosevelt. She revised those books and added both a preface and final chapter, titled "The Search for Understanding". There was also new material that brought coverage of her life up to 1961. It was first published in 1961 by Harper & Brothers. The book gives extensive coverage to her husband. Stella K. Hershan wrote in her book The Candles She Lit that "one can hardly turn a page" without Franklin being mentioned or referenced. In 2014 it was announced that Harper Perennial would republish the book.

== Reception ==
The Eleanor Roosevelt Encyclopedia wrote that "these memoirs offered a self-deprecating account of her activities that shaped the work of her early biographers". It goes on to describe the prose as "flat, uninflected" and focusing on public activities rather than private. They conclude that "cumulatively, [the memoirs] record the development of strength, confidence, and a complicated sense of self." Kirkus Reviews wrote that "rarely has there been an autobiography so completely revealing of its author." The Guardian wrote that "The compilation is more useful than a newly written autobiography would be, for it enables us to follow the course not only of Mrs Roosevelt’s life but also of her development in personality and outlook." A review published in The Kansas City Star wrote that her autobiography was a study of the life of a "citizen of the world." It continued to note that there was "not a trace of bitterness or self pity" and concluded that the book should be read "because of the personality which quietly emerges" throughout her memoir. An Associated Press article written in 2000 called the book "serious, instructive".

== Bibliography ==
- Harris, Cynthia M. (2007). Eleanor Roosevelt : a biography. Westport, Conn.: Greenwood Press. ISBN 978-0-313-33166-4. OCLC 128236391.
- Beasley, Maurine Hoffman; Shulman, Holly Cowan; Beasley, Henry R.; Press, Greenwood (2001). The Eleanor Roosevelt Encyclopedia. Greenwood Publishing Group. ISBN 978-0-313-30181-0.
- Hershan, Stella K. (1993). The candles she lit : the legacy of Eleanor Roosevelt. Westport, Conn.: Praeger. ISBN 0-275-94366-6. OCLC 27429534.
