= This Is My Story (memoir) =

1937 memoir by Eleanor Roosevelt

This is My Story
- First edition (1937)
- Author: Eleanor Roosevelt
- Publisher: Harper & Brothers
- Publication date: 1937
- Pages: 365

This is My Story is a 1937 autobiographical memoir by Eleanor Roosevelt, an American political figure, diplomat, activist and First Lady of the United States while her husband, Franklin D. Roosevelt, was President of the United States. This is My Story was the first of four memoirs written by Roosevelt, the other three being This I Remember, On My Own, and The Autobiography of Eleanor Roosevelt. It was very well received by critics and a financial success.

== Background ==
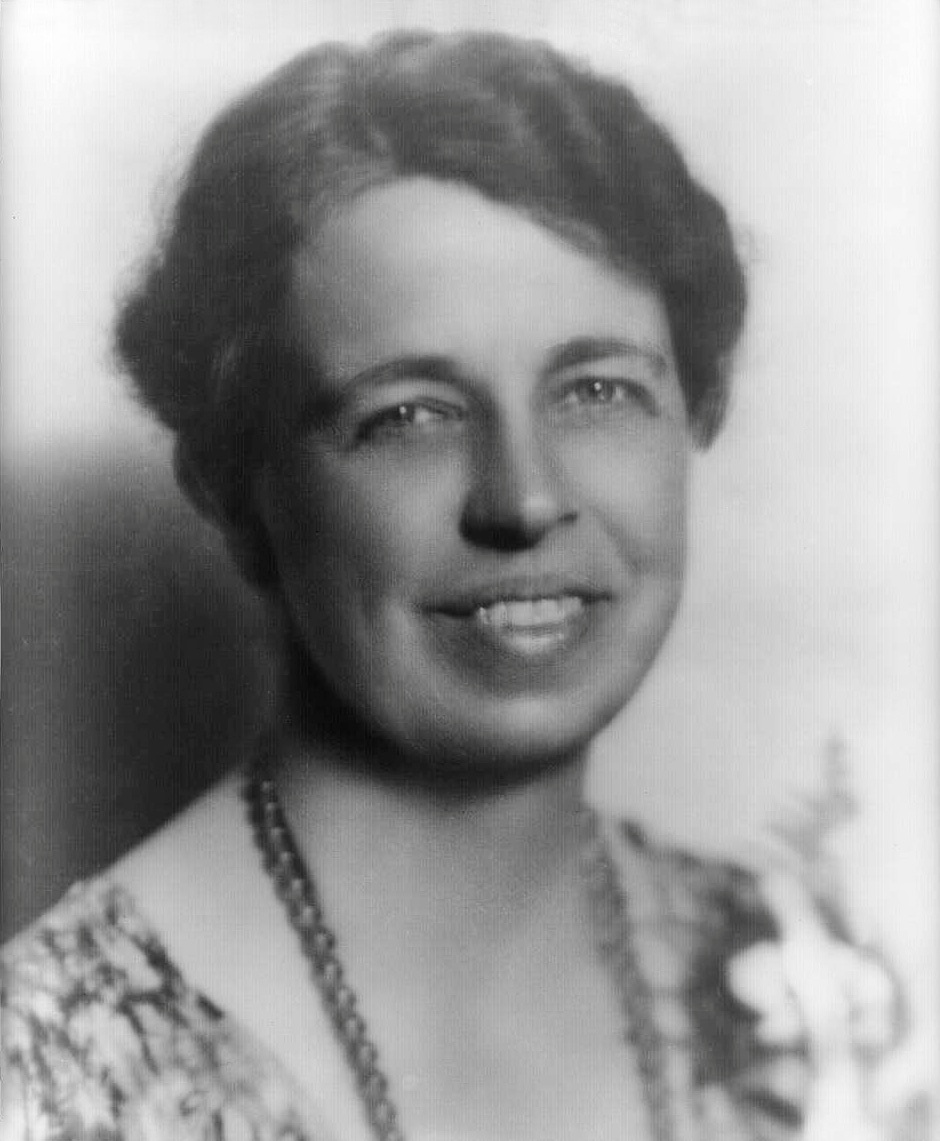
Roosevelt in 1933

Eleanor Roosevelt was born on October 11, 1884, in New York City. A member of the prominent Roosevelt family, she grew up surrounded by material wealth, but had a difficult childhood, suffering the deaths of both of her parents and a brother before she was ten. Roosevelt was sent by relatives to the Allenswood School five years later. While there, Marie Souvestre, the founder of the school, influenced her. She wrote in This is My Story that "Whatever I have become had its seeds in those three years of contact with a liberal mind and strong personality." When she was eighteen, Roosevelt returned to New York and joined the National Consumers League. She married Franklin D. Roosevelt, her cousin, in 1905. They would have five children.

Eleanor was involved in her husband's political career as he won a seat in the New York State Senate in 1911 and traveled with him to Washington, D.C., when he was made United States Secretary of War in Woodrow Wilson's cabinet. She became involved in volunteer work during World War I. In 1918, she discovered that Franklin was having an affair with Lucy Mercer Rutherfurd and resolved to develop her own life. She continued to help her husband in his political career but also began working in various reform movements, including the women's suffrage movement. As First Lady of the United States following Franklin's election as President of the United States in 1932, Eleanor "set the standard against which president's wives have been measured ever since", working to create opportunities for women, the establishment of the National Youth Administration, and championing civil rights for African-Americans. While Franklin was president she wrote 2,500 newspaper columns, 299 magazine articles, 6 books, and traveled around the country giving speeches.

Eleanor remained politically active after her husband's death, serving as the first United States Representative to the United Nations and chairing the United Nations Commission on Human Rights when the Universal Declaration of Human Rights was drafted. She later chaired John F. Kennedy's Presidential Commission on the Status of Women before her death in 1962. The American National Biography concludes that she was "perhaps the most influential American woman of the twentieth century".

== Writing and publication ==
Eleanor wrote This Is My Story in 1936. The book was published in 1937 by Harper & Brothers. The first edition was 365 pages. It was an autobiographical account of Eleanor's life to shortly before Franklin's involvement in Al Smith's campaign for governor of New York in 1924. It was Eleanor's first autobiographical work to be published. The book was serialized in the Ladies' Home Journal, which she had previously written for. The editors of the journal paid $75,000 for the rights. Publication in the Journal and the book were both very successful—the book's first installment in the Ladies Home Journal sold 250,000 copies. The editors of the journal wrote that they made "the exciting discover that Eleanor Roosevelt's autobiography was read, in effect, by everyone—in government, parlors, and slums." That year, Eleanor made $75,000 (equivalent to $1,679,687 in 2025), in part from the book (and also from speaking and publishing other works), which was more than her husband.

== Reception ==
Writing in The New York Times, Katharine Woods reviewed the book very positively, concluding that it represented "the frank, unaffected, courageous story of an American woman's life, told in generosity, effectiveness and perception, and with the kind of objectivity which bespeaks the absence of any vanity, self complacence or pettiness" and that the book is "not only large-hearted and veracious but strikingly unusual and intensely individual and alive." Lloyd Morris in The North American Review wrote that the book received "almost unanimous praise" from the press and wrote that the book was "ingenious", and felt "the record" of the development of social consciousness during Eleanor's life was "admirably set forth." He concluded by calling the book "a vista of more complete individual function." A review published in the El Paso Herald-Post concluded that "it is good to find" a woman who "did not return to an empty social round, but put on her hat". The St. Louis Globe-Democrat wrote that the book "tells a personal story in an interesting manner" and felt "the reader, whose interest, we predict, will never lag, will find this a genuinely human story of a woman who is a great lady ... because of what she is," concluding that it "is the story of American womanhood at its best."

== Bibliography ==
- Harris, Cynthia M. (2007). Eleanor Roosevelt : a biography. Westport, Conn.: Greenwood Press. ISBN 978-0-313-33166-4. OCLC 128236391.
- Beasley, Maurine Hoffman; Shulman, Holly Cowan; Beasley, Henry R.; Press, Greenwood (2001). The Eleanor Roosevelt Encyclopedia. Greenwood Publishing Group. ISBN 978-0-313-30181-0.
