= Anna Morton =

Second Lady of the United States

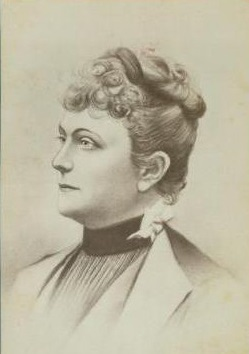

Second Lady of the United States
- In role March 4, 1889 – March 4, 1893
- Vice President: Levi P. Morton
- Preceded by: Eliza Hendricks
- Succeeded by: Letitia Stevenson

First Lady of New York
- In role January 1, 1895 – December 31, 1896
- Governor: Levi P. Morton
- Preceded by: Sarah M. Flower
- Succeeded by: Lois B. Black

Personal details
- Born: Anna Livingston Reade Street; May 18, 1846 Poughkeepsie, New York, U.S.
- Died: August 14, 1918 (aged 72) Rhinecliff, New York, U.S.
- Resting place: Rhinebeck Cemetery, Rhinebeck, New York
- Spouse: Levi Parsons Morton (m. 1873)
- Children: 6
- Relatives: Randall S. Street (grandfather)

Anna Livingston Reade Morton (née Street; May 18, 1846 – August 14, 1918) was the second wife of Vice President Levi P. Morton and the second lady of the United States from 1889 to 1893. She was known as Anna Street Morton.

== Early life ==
Anna Livingston Reade Street was born on May 18, 1846, in Poughkeepsie, New York, the daughter of William Ingram Street (died 1863) and Susan Watts (née Kearney) Street (1819–1893).

Her paternal grandfather was Randall S. Street, a lawyer and member of the U.S. House of Representatives. Her uncle was Alfred Billings Street, a lawyer and prominent poet. Her maternal grandparents were Ann (née Reade) Kearney and Robert Kearney. Through her grandmother Ann, the daughter of Catherine Livingston and John Reade, she was a descendant of Robert Livingston the Elder, 1st Lord of Livingston Manor.

== Career ==
After they married, her husband became a member of the U.S. House of Representatives in 1879, serving until 1881 when he was appointed the United States Minister to France by President James A. Garfield in 1881. Morton was U.S. Minister until May 14, 1885, and Anna was noted for as a highly cultivated French scholar.

=== Second Lady of the United States (1889-1893) ===
During her husband's term as Vice President of the United States under President Benjamin Harrison, she was Second Lady of the United States from 1889 to 1893 and often handled entertaining duties for the administration due to First Lady Caroline Harrison's illness and ultimate death. During this time, the Mortons lived on Scott Circle in Washington, D.C., and Mrs. Morton "became the leader of society in Washington, and there was never a more brilliant and popular leader than she. It was her innate graciousness, her innate tact, and her kindness of heart . . . which won her admiration and respect of all".

=== First Lady of New York (1895-1896) ===
After the Mortons left Washington, Levi became the Governor of New York and Anna served as the First Lady of New York from 1895 to 1896.

== Personal life ==
In 1873, Anna was married to Levi Parsons Morton (1824–1920), just two years after the death of his first wife, Lucy Young Kimball, in 1871. Together, Anna and Levi had five daughters and a son together. A son, Lewis died at the age of four months in London, and daughters Lena and Alice predeceased their mother.

- Edith Livingston Morton (1874–1964), who married William Corcoran Eustis (1862–1921), son of George Eustis, Jr.
- Lena Kearney Morton (1875–1905)
- Helen Stuyvesant Morton (1876–1952), who married Paul Louis Marie Archambaud, Boson de Talleyrand-Périgord (1867–1952), a son of the Charles Guillaume Frédéric, Boson de Talleyrand-Périgord, Prince de Sagan.
- Lewis Parsons Morton (1877–1878), who died young.
- Alice Morton (1879–1917), who married Winthrop Chanler Rutherfurd (1862–1944), son of Lewis Morris Rutherfurd.
- Mary Morton (1881–1932), who adopted two children, Lewis Peter Morton and Mirian Morton.

She died at her home, "Ellerslie" in Rhinebeck, New York, on August 14, 1918, at the age of 72.

=== Philanthropy ===
In December 1904, the Mortons anonymously gave $600,000 to the Cathedral of St. John the Divine in New York City. In January 1905, The New York Times revealed that the Mortons were the givers, including funds for the purchase of an organ in memory of their daughter Lena who died in Paris the June previous.

== Sources ==
- Persico, Joseph E. (2008). Franklin & Lucy: President Roosevelt, Mrs. Rutherfurd, and the Other Remarkable Women in His Life. Random House. ISBN 9781400064427.

Honorary titles
Vacant Title last held by Eliza Hendricks	Second Lady of the United States; 1889–1893	Succeeded by Letitia Stevenson
