= Winthrop Rutherfurd =

American socialite (1862–1944)

- Born: Winthrop Chanler Rutherfurd; February 4, 1862
- Died: March 19, 1944 (aged 82); Aiken, South Carolina
- Education: Columbia College (1884)
- Known for: Relationship with Consuelo Vanderbilt
- Spouses: Alice Morton (m. 1902; died 1917) Lucy Mercer (m. 1920)
- Children: 7
- Parent(s): Lewis Morris Rutherfurd; Margaret Chanler Stuyvesant
- Relatives: Rutherfurd Stuyvesant (brother); Lewis Morris Rutherfurd Jr. (brother); John Winthrop Chanler (uncle); Henry White (brother-in-law); Anne Harriman Vanderbilt (sister-in-law)

Winthrop Chanler Rutherfurd (February 4, 1862 – March 19, 1944) was an American socialite from New York, best known for his romance with Consuelo Vanderbilt and his marriage to Lucy Mercer, mistress to American President Franklin D. Roosevelt.

== Early life ==
Rutherfurd was born on February 4, 1862. He was the youngest son of seven children born to Lewis Morris Rutherfurd (1816–1892) and Margaret Chanler Stuyvesant (1820–1890). His elder siblings included Stuyvesant Rutherfurd (1843–1909), Louisa Morris Rutherfurd (1855–1892), Margaret Stuyvesant Rutherfurd (1853–1916), who was married to Henry White, and Lewis Morris Rutherfurd, Jr. (1859–1901), who was married to Anne Harriman Vanderbilt (1861–1940).

His paternal grandparents were Robert Walter Rutherfurd (1788–1852) and Sabina Morris (1789–1857) of Morrisania. He was the great-grandson of U.S. Senator John Rutherfurd and 2x great-grandson of Lewis Morris, a signer of the Declaration of Independence. Rutherfurd was a direct descendant of Peter Stuyvesant, the last Dutch Director-General of New Netherland before it became New York, as well as John Winthrop, the first Governor of Massachusetts. His mother was the niece and adopted daughter of Peter Gerard Stuyvesant (1778–1847), the 2x great-grandson of Peter Stuyvesant and Helena Rutherfurd Stuyvesant. His mother's siblings included Elizabeth Winthrop Chanler (1824–1904) and John Winthrop Chanler (1826–1877).

He was a graduate of Columbia College in 1884.

== Society life ==
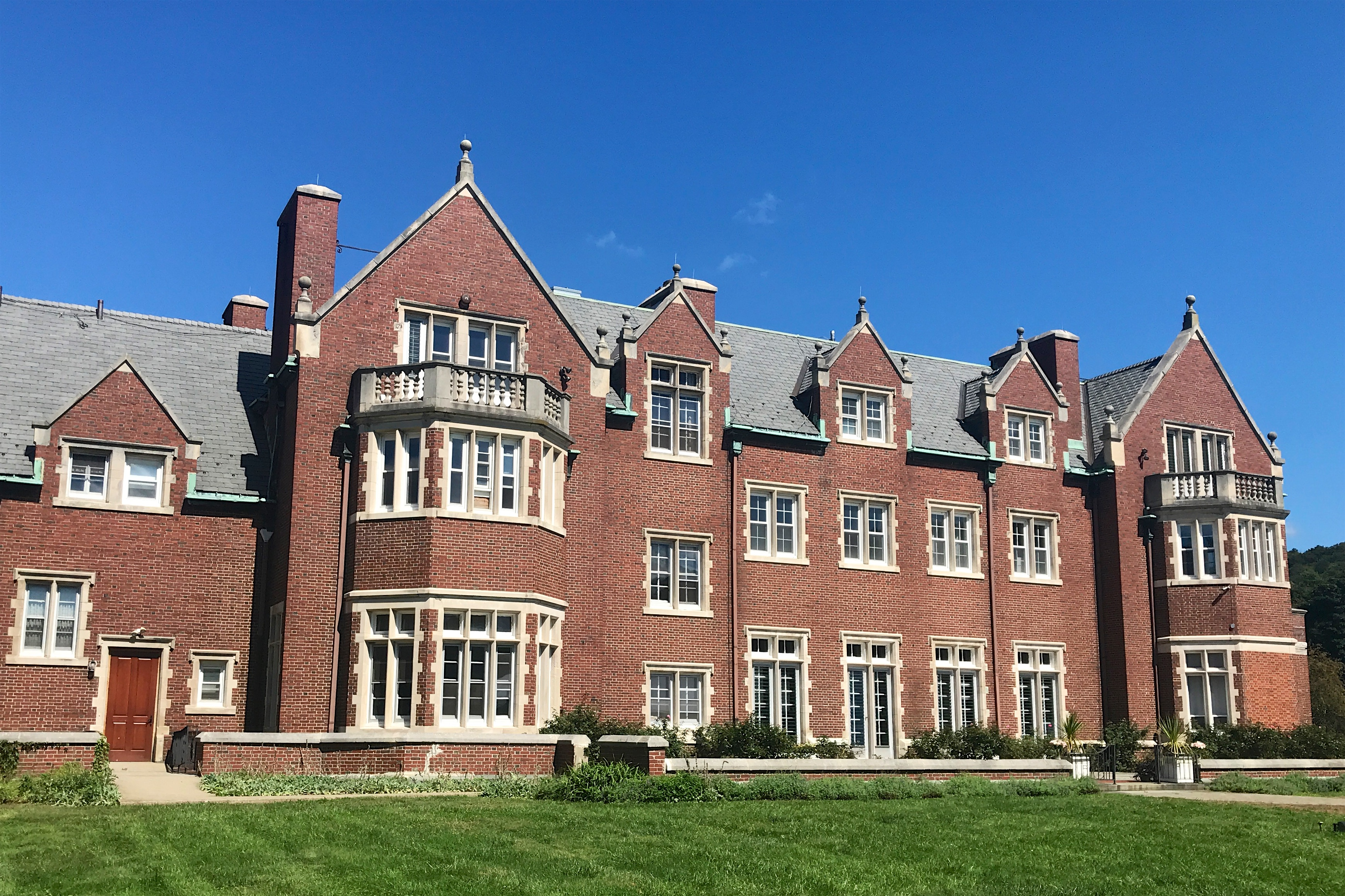
Rutherfurd House in Allamuchy Township, New Jersey

Rutherfurd was one of the social elite nicknamed "The Four Hundred" by Ward McAllister, a number supposedly taken from the capacity of Caroline Webster Schermerhorn Astor's ballroom. Novelist Edith Wharton described Rutherfurd as "the prototype of my first novels".

In 1902, shortly after his first marriage, Rutherfurd and his wife Alice contracted prominent New York City architect Whitney Warren to design for them a Tudor revival style mansion known as Rutherfurd House. The approximately 38-room home was located alongside his brother Stuyvesant Rutherfurd's property in Allamuchy Township, New Jersey. Besides the mansion, construction included gardens, a boathouse, a swimming beach, a hydroelectric powerhouse, a 9-hole golf course, and kennels. The farm's 1,000 acres became well known for its Holstein cows and Dorset sheep.

After his second wedding, in 1920, Rutherfurd built an estate called Ridgeley Hall in Aiken, South Carolina, where he pursued his favorite hobby of breeding Fox Terriers. In 1907, Rutherfurd won the first Best in Show prize of the Westminster Kennel Club Dog Show with his fox terrier Warren Remedy, who would also win in 1908 and 1909.

== Personal life ==
Coat of Arms of Winthrop Rutherfurd

In 1895, Consuelo Vanderbilt fell in love with Rutherfurd, and Rutherfurd proposed marriage to her. However, Consuelo's mother Alva Vanderbilt forced Consuelo to travel to Europe, and pressured her to marry Charles Spencer-Churchill, 9th Duke of Marlborough, in order to gain the title and status of a duchess. After Consuelo was persuaded that Alva might suffer a fatal heart attack if Consuelo disobeyed her, Consuelo agreed to forsake Rutherfurd and marry the Duke. Rutherfurd then remained a bachelor until age 40, reportedly having numerous affairs with married socialites, including Ava Astor. In 1926, when Consuelo's annulment was announced, the reason from Rome was that "Consuelo, when 17, and in love with 'an American named Rutherfurd,' had been forced by her mother, Mrs. O. H. P. Belmont, to give him up to marry the Duke."

In 1902, Rutherfurd married Alice Morton (1879–1917), the fourth daughter of former US Vice President Levi Parsons Morton and Anna Livingston Reade Street. Her sister Helen, was married to Paul Louis Marie Archambaud, Boson de Talleyrand-Périgord (1867–1952), a son of the Charles Guillaume Frédéric, Boson de Talleyrand-Périgord, Prince de Sagan, and her oldest sister, Edith, was married to William Corcoran Eustis (1862–1921). Alice died fifteen years later in 1917, leaving behind five sons and a daughter:

- Lewis Morton Rutherfurd (1903–1920), who died age 16.
- Winthrop Rutherfurd, Jr. (1904–1988), who married Alice Polk (1917–2009), daughter of Frank Lyon Polk, in 1940.
- John Phillip "Jack" Rutherfurd (1910–1987), who was married to Elizabeth "Betty" Shevlin Smith (1911–1957), daughter of Tom Shevlin (1883-1915), and to Jacqueline Orr (1923–2004).
- Hugo Rutherfurd (1911–2006), who was married to Francesca Villa (1922–1995) in 1941.
- Alice Rutherfurd (1913–1953), who married Arturo Peralta Ramos, the former husband of Millicent Rogers, in 1943.
- Guy Gerard Rutherfurd (1915–2012), who married Georgette Whelan (d. 2004) in 1938.

In 1913, upon the advice of Anna Roosevelt Cowles, Lucy Mercer was hired as a social secretary to Eleanor Roosevelt, Cowles's niece. In September 1918, Eleanor discovered the affair Lucy had with Eleanor's husband Franklin. The relationship ended and soon, Mercer then became the governess for Rutherfurd's six children. Rutherfurd soon proposed to Mercer, who was almost three decades younger, and Mercer accepted. She was the daughter of Col. and Mrs. Carroll Mercer of Washington. Only weeks before their wedding, which took place on February 11, 1920, Lewis, Rutherfurd's oldest son, died of pneumonia. Various observers described Winthrop and Lucy as devoted to one another, and their marriage as a happy one. Together, they had a daughter:

- Barbara Mercer Rutherfurd (1922–2005), who married Robert Winthrop "Bobby" Knowles, Jr. (d. 2003) in 1946.

Rutherfurd died in Aiken on March 19, 1944, after a long period of failing health. Lucy, who was by FDR's side when he died in 1945, died aged 57, on July 31, 1948. In 1966, both Barbara and Franklin D. Roosevelt Jr. denied the relationship between her mother and his father.

=== Descendants ===
Rutherfurd was the grandfather of financier Lewis Polk Rutherfurd (b. 1944) who was married to Janet Jennings Auchincloss (1945–1985), the half-sister of former First Lady Jacqueline Kennedy Onassis, from 1966 until her death in 1985. He married Katharine du Pont Sanger in 1988.

Actress Emily Rutherfurd is his great-granddaughter.
