= John Campbell White =

John Campbell White may refer to:

- John Campbell White, 1st Baron Overtoun (1843–1908), Scottish chemicals manufacturer
- John Campbell White (Irish politician) (died 1923), High Sheriff of Belfast and Lord Mayor of Belfast
- John Campbell White (diplomat) (1884–1967), American diplomat, US ambassador to Haiti and Peru
- John Campbell White (United Irishman) (1757–1847), executive member of the Society of United Irishmen
