= Randall S. Street =

American politician (1780–1841)

Member of the U.S. House of Representatives from New York's 4th district
- In office March 4, 1819 – March 3, 1821
- Preceded by: James Tallmadge Jr.
- Succeeded by: William W. Van Wyck

Personal details
- Born: 1780 Catskill, New York, U.S.
- Died: November 21, 1841 (aged 60–61) Monticello, New York, U.S.
- Resting place: Poughkeepsie, New York, U.S.
- Party: Federalist
- Children: Alfred Billings Street
- Relatives: Anna Morton (granddaughter); Levi P. Morton (grandson-in-law)
- Occupation: Politician, lawyer

Military service
- Allegiance: United States
- Rank: Lieutenant colonel
- Battles/wars: War of 1812

Randall S. Street (1780 Catskill, then Albany Co., now Greene County, New York – November 21, 1841 Monticello, Sullivan County, New York) was an American lawyer and politician from New York.

== Life ==
Street pursued classical studies. He studied law, and was admitted to the bar and began practice in Poughkeepsie. He was District Attorney for the Second District (comprising Rockland, Orange, Ulster, Dutchess and Delaware counties) from February 1810 to February 1811, and from March 1813 to February 1815. In the War of 1812 he served as lieutenant colonel of militia.

Street was elected as a Federalist to the 16th United States Congress, holding office from March 4, 1819, to March 3, 1821. In 1823, he removed to Monticello where he continued the practice of law until his death. He was interred in Poughkeepsie.

He was the father of poet, author and New York State Librarian Alfred Billings Street, and grandfather of Anna Morton, wife of Levi P. Morton, who served as Vice President of the United States under Benjamin Harrison.

He was married to Cornelia Billings.

== Sources ==
- United States Congress. "Randall S. Street (id: S001002)". Biographical Directory of the United States Congress.
- The New York Civil List (1858; pages 71, 367 and 448)

U.S. House of Representatives
Preceded by James Tallmadge, Jr.	Member of the U.S. House of Representatives from New York's 4th congressional district 1819–1821	Succeeded by William W. Van Wyck
