= Alfred Billings Street =

American writer

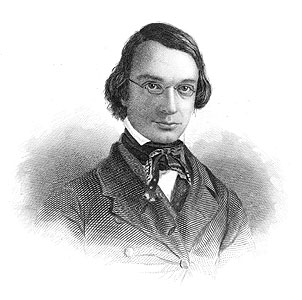
- Born: December 18, 1811; Poughkeepsie, New York, United States
- Died: June 2, 1881 (aged 69); Albany, New York, United States
- Resting place: Albany Rural Cemetery
- Occupations: Writer; poet; editor; librarian
- Spouse: Elizabeth Weed Street
- Children: 1
- Relatives: Randall S. Street (father)

Alfred Billings Street (December 18, 1811–June 2, 1881) was an American writer and poet. His parents were Randal S. Street and Corneila Billings.

== Biography ==
Street was born in Poughkeepsie, New York. His family moved to Monticello in Sullivan County when he was young, and he was educated at the Duchess County Academy inSullivan County, New York before moving in 1825. He later studied law with his father, Randall Sandal Street, and practiced in Monticello.

As a teenager, he published poems, A Day in March and A Winter Scene in the Evening Post.

In 1839 he moved to Albany and settled a small law office. Two years later he married Elizabeth Weed Street, and from 1843 to 1844 he edited the Northern Light. In 1848, he was appointed New York State Librarian, a position he held until his death.

He was a correspondent of Horace Greeley.

His poems deal with the sights and sounds of the woodland and the life of the more primitive days of the settlement of America.

In 1842, Edgar Allan Poe wrote about Billings, "Mr. Street has a fine taste, and a keen sense of the beautiful. He writes carefully, elaborately, [a]nd correctly."

== List of works ==
Among his books of verse are:

- The Burning of Schenectady, and Other Poems (1842)
- Drawings and Tintings (1844)
- Fugitive Poems (1846)
- Frontenac: or The Atotarho of the Iroquois (1849)

His chief prose works are:

- Woods and Waters, or the Saranacs and the Racket (1860)
- The Indian Pass (1869)
- Lake and Mountain; or, Autumn in the Adirondacks (1870)
- Eagle Pine; or, Sketches of a New York Frontier Village (1871)

He also wrote A Digest of Taxation in the United States (1863).
