= Rutherfurd Stuyvesant =

American socialite and land developer

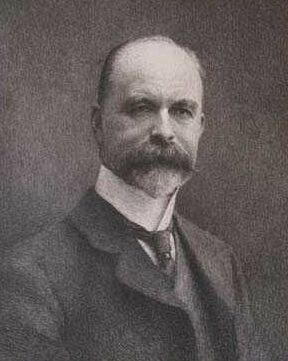
- Born: Stuyvesant Rutherfurd; September 2, 1843
- Died: July 4, 1909 (aged 65); Paris, France
- Education: Columbia College (1863)
- Spouses: Mary Pierrepont (m. 1863; died 1879) Mathilde, Countess de Wassanaer (m. 1902)
- Children: 2
- Parent(s): Lewis Morris Rutherfurd; Margaret Chanler Stuyvesant
- Relatives: Winthrop Rutherfurd (brother); Lewis Morris Rutherfurd Jr. (brother); John Winthrop Chanler (uncle); Henry White (brother-in-law); Anne Harriman Vanderbilt (sister-in-law)

Rutherfurd Stuyvesant or Stuyvesant Rutherfurd (September 2, 1843 – July 4, 1909) was an American socialite and land developer from New York, best known as the inheritor of the Stuyvesant fortune.

== Early life ==
Rutherfurd was born on September 2, 1843. He was the oldest of seven children born to Lewis Morris Rutherfurd (1816–1892) and Margaret Chanler Stuyvesant (1820–1890). His younger siblings included Louisa Morris Rutherfurd (1855–1892), Margaret Stuyvesant Rutherfurd (1853-1916), who was married to Henry White, Lewis Morris Rutherfurd Jr. (1859–1901), who was married to Anne Harriman Vanderbilt (1861–1940), and Winthrop Rutherfurd (1886-1944), who was married to Lucy Mercer Rutherfurd, a mistress of Franklin D. Roosevelt.

His paternal grandparents were Robert Walter Rutherfurd (1788–1852) and Sabina Morris (1789–1857) of Morrisania. He was the great-grandson of U.S. Senator John Rutherfurd and 2x great-grandson of Lewis Morris, the Signer of the Declaration of Independence. Rutherfurd was a direct descendant of Peter Stuyvesant, the last Dutch Director-General of New Netherland before it became New York, as well as John Winthrop, the first Governor of Massachusetts. His mother's siblings included Elizabeth Winthrop Chanler (1824–1904) and John Winthrop Chanler (1826–1877). Among his cousins was U.S. Representative William Astor Chanler.

Stuyvesant was an 1863 graduate of Columbia College. While at Columbia College he joined St. Anthony Hall in 1859 ( AKA Delta Psi fraternity ).

=== Name change ===
In 1847, the six year old Stuyvesant Rutherfurd changed his name to Rutherfurd Stuyvesant to conform with the will of his mother's great-uncle, Peter Gerard Stuyvesant, who died childless, in order to inherit the Stuyvesant fortune. His mother was the niece and adopted daughter of Peter Gerard Stuyvesant (1778–1847), the 2x great-grandson of Peter Stuyvesant, and Helena Rutherfurd Stuyvesant.

== Career ==
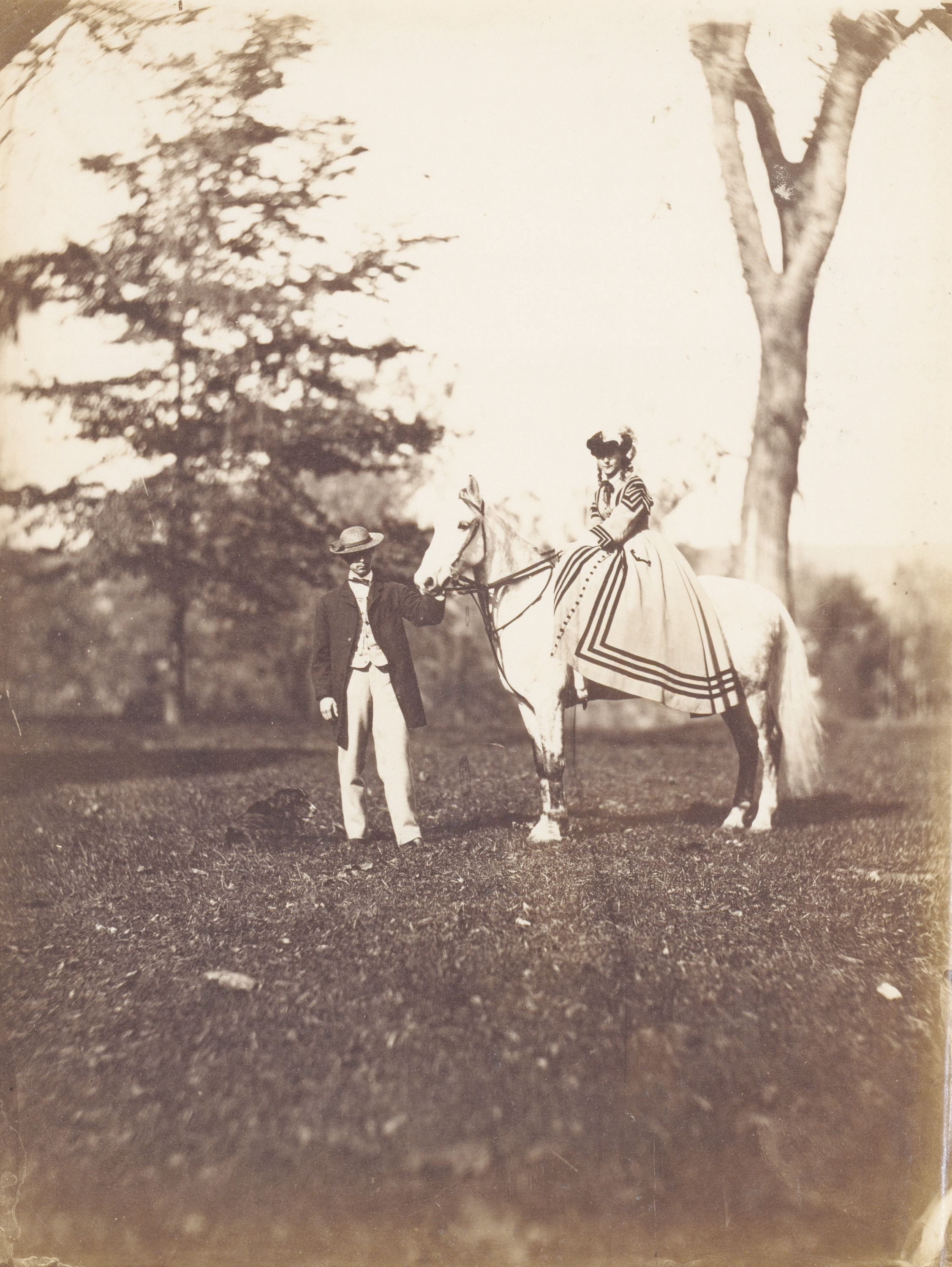
Photograph of Stuyvesant and his first wife, Mary Pierrepont, c. 1863

Stuyvesant was known as a very successful land developer of New York City.

In 1869, Stuyvesant hired Richard Morris Hunt to build the "first true apartment building in New York", located on the present day site of 142 East 18th Street near Gramercy Park. The building was a five story walk up built for middle-class tenants. The New-York Tribune wrote "It is an attempt to introduce in this city the style of house-building almost universal in Paris, that of including several distinct suites of rooms under a single roof. This is wholly different from the plan of the tenement house."

=== Society life ===
Stuyvesant was a collector of arms and armor, fine china and paintings.

His mansion in New York was located at the corner of Second Avenue and 15th Street, near most of the Stuyvesant and Rutherfurd properties.

He had an estate in the country, known as Tranquility Farms, near Hackettstown, New Jersey that was the original Stuyvesant homestead. He enlarged the home which was located on 7,000 acres and included a park stocked with elk, deer, ponds with beavers, and pheasants. The estate was completely burned down in 1959.

He was a member of the Union Club of New York, the Century Club, the City Racquet Club, the New York Yacht Club, the Atlantic Yacht Club and the Seawanhaka Corinthian Yacht Clubs, The Downtown Association, The Columbia College Alumni Association, New-York Historical Society, and the American Geographical Society. He was a fellow at the American Museum of Natural History and the National Academy of Design, and a patron and trustee of the Metropolitan Museum of Art.

== Personal life ==
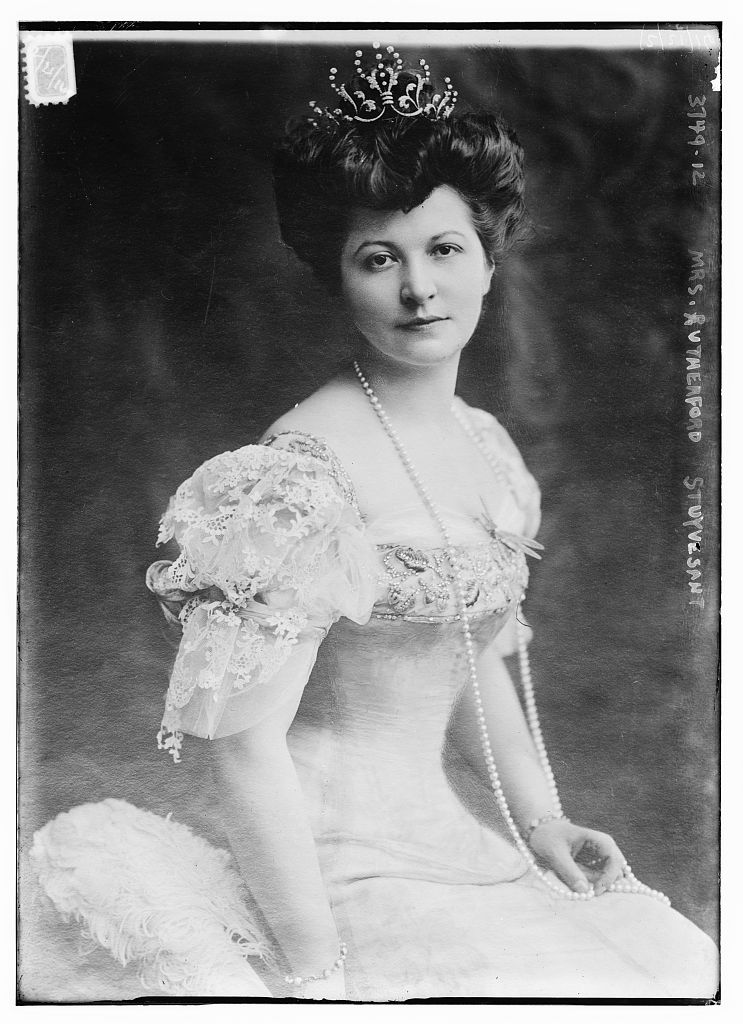
Photograph of his second wife, the former Countess de Wassanaer, c. 1915-1920.

In 1863, he was married to Mary Pierrepont (1842–1879), a daughter of Henry Evelyn Pierrepont (1808–1888) and Anna Maria Jay (1819–1902), and a granddaughter of Peter Augustus Jay. She, along with a son, died at the Stuyvesant mansion during childbirth in 1879.

In 1902, he was married to Countess Mathilde Elizabeth de Wassenaer (1877–1948), the daughter of Joseph Loewenguth, at St. George's Chapel on Albemarle Street in London. She was divorced from a Dutch Count. Together, they were the parents of:

- Lewis Rutherfurd Stuyvesant (1903–1944), who married Rosalie Stuyvesant Pillot in 1925, daughter of Peter Stuyvesant Pillot. They divorced in 1930. He later married Elizabeth (née Larocque) Smith in 1934. The couple had one child, Peter Winthrop Rutherfurd Stuyvesant (1935–1970). Elizabeth was the former wife of Schuyler Knowlton Smith and the daughter of Joseph Laroque.
- Alan Rutherfurd Stuyvesant (1905–1954), who did not marry. He was injured in a car accident in 1934. He died aboard a ship just short of arriving at their destination to France.

Rutherfurd died suddenly while out for his customary morning walk in the Champs-Élysées in Paris on July 4, 1909. After his death, his widow married Prince Alexandre de Caraman-Chimay, the son of Prince Joseph de Caraman-Chimay and brother of Joseph, Prince de Caraman-Chimay. The Princess Alexandre de Caraman Chimay died in 1948 and was buried in the Stuyvesant family plot at Tranquility Cemetery, New Jersey.
