= Lewis Morris Rutherfurd =

American lawyer and astronomer (1816–1892)

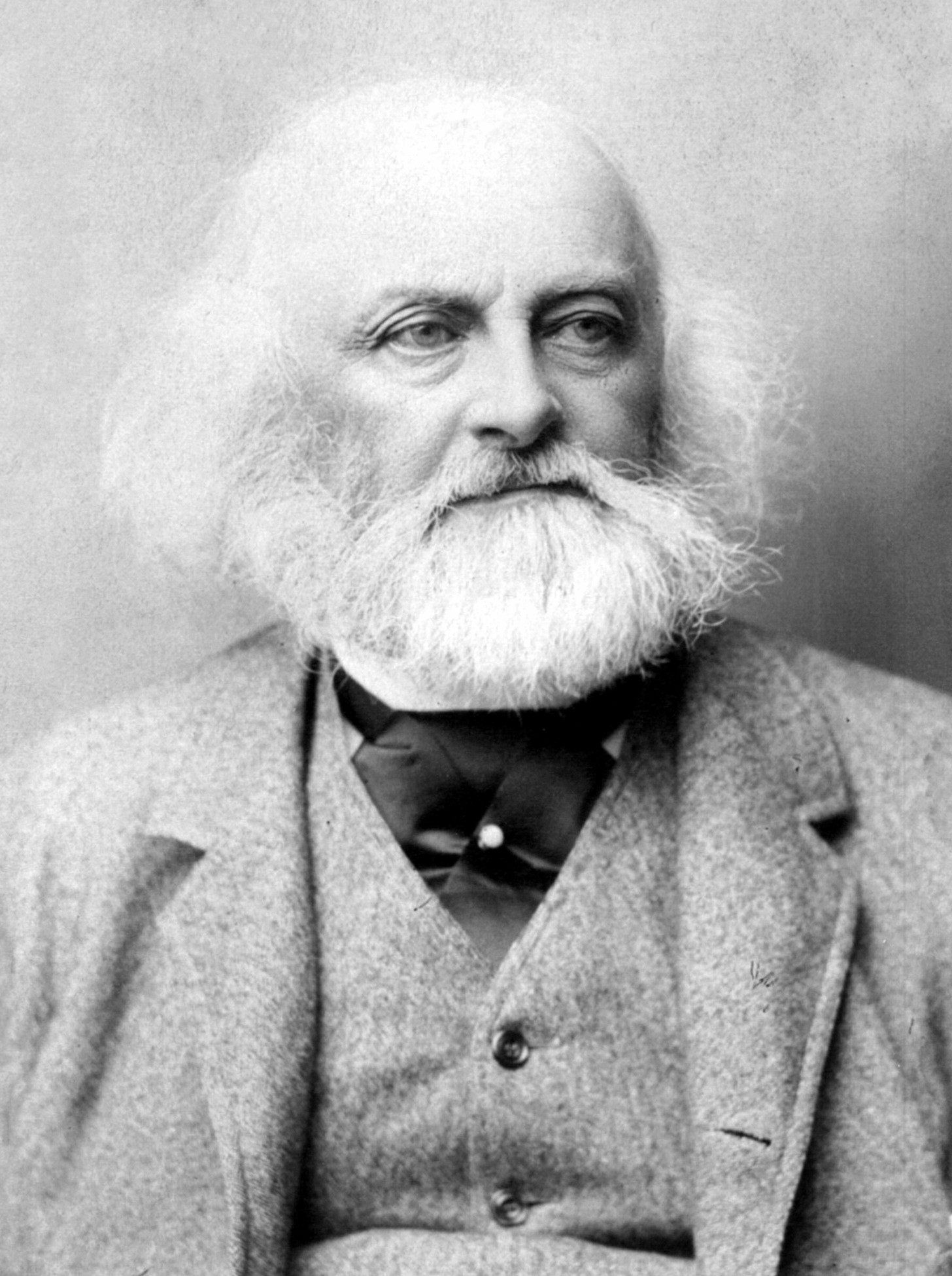
- Lewis Morris Rutherfurd
- Born: November 25, 1816; Morrisania, New York, US
- Died: May 30, 1892 (aged 75); Tranquility, New Jersey, US
- Education: Williams College
- Known for: Astrophotography
- Spouse: Margaret Stuyvesant Chanler (m. 1841; died 1890)
- Children: 7, including Stuyvesant, Lewis Jr., Winthrop
- Scientific career
- Fields: Astronomy

Lewis Morris Rutherfurd (November 25, 1816 – May 30, 1892) was an American lawyer and astronomer, and a pioneering astrophotographer.

== Early life and work ==
Rutherfurd was born in Morrisania, New York, to Robert Walter Rutherfurd (1788–1852) and Sabina Morris (1789–1857) of Morrisania. He was the grandson of John Rutherfurd, U.S. Senator from 1791 to 1798, and great-grandson of Lewis Morris, a signer of the Declaration of Independence. Major General William Alexander, the Earl of Stirling, was the uncle of his grandfather.

He graduated from Williams College, Massachusetts, in 1834.

== Career ==
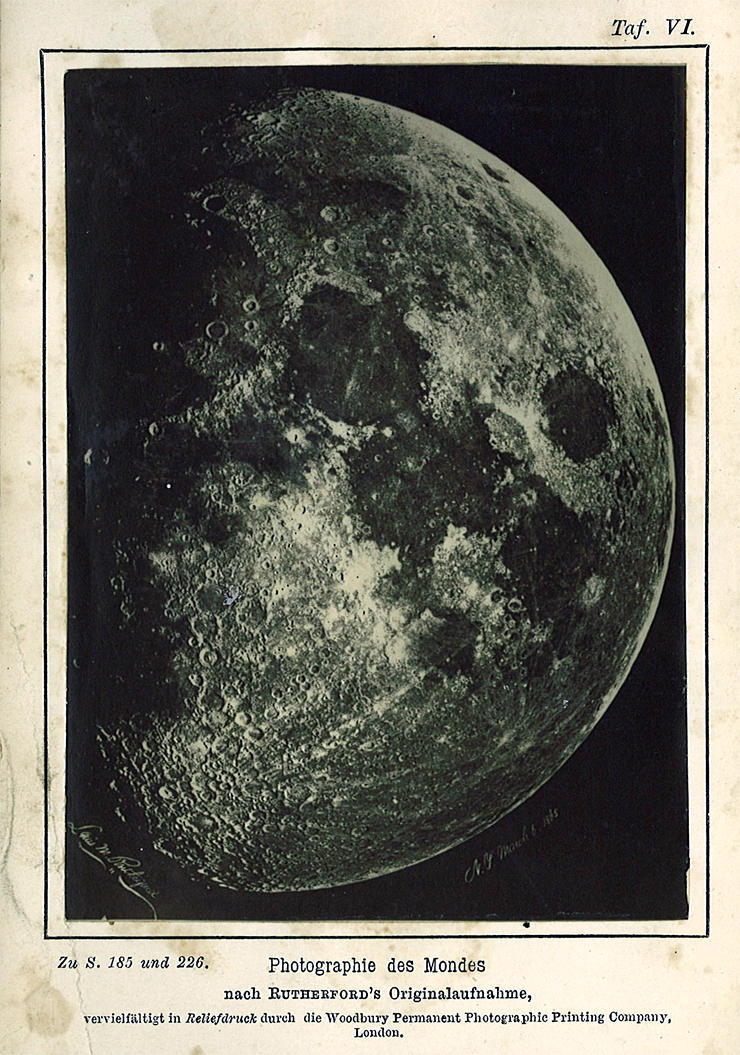
Moon, New York, 6 March 1865 – Lewis M. Rutherfurd (misspelled as Rutherford in this frontispiece of the 1873 book by Hermann Wilhelm Vogel)

Soon after graduating from Williams, he began practicing law after being admitted to the bar in 1837 with William H. Seward, who eventually served as the United States Secretary of State, in Auburn, New York. In practicing, he associated with Peter A. Jay, the eldest son of the first United States Chief Justice, John Jay, until his death in 1843. At that point, he began working with Hamilton Fish, who also became a U.S. Senator and the U.S. Secretary of State.

=== Astronomy and astrophotography ===
In 1849, Rutherfurd abandoned his study of law to dedicate his leisure to science, particularly astronomy. He performed pioneering work in spectral analysis, and experimented with celestial photography. He invented instruments for his studies, including the micrometer for measuring photographs, a machine for producing improved ruled diffraction gratings, and the first telescope designed specifically for astrophotography.

Using his instrumentation, Rutherfurd produced a quality collection of photographs of the Sun, Moon, and planets, as well as star clusters and stars down to the fifth magnitude. In 1862, he began making spectroscopic studies using his new diffraction grating. He noticed distinct categories of spectral classes of stars, which Angelo Secchi expanded upon in 1867 to list a set of four stellar classes.

Rutherfurd served as a trustee of the Columbia University from 1858 until 1884, and donated his photographs to that institution.

In 1873, then President Ulysses S. Grant appointed Rutherfurd one of the scientific commission to attend the Vienna Exposition, however, he declined the honor due to previous business engagements in the United States. In 1884, he was named by President Chester A. Arthur as one of the delegates to the International Meridian Conference which met in Washington in October, 1885.

He was one of the original members of the National Academy of Sciences created in 1863, and was an associate of the Royal Astronomical Society.

== Personal life ==
Coat of Arms of Lewis Morris Rutherfurd

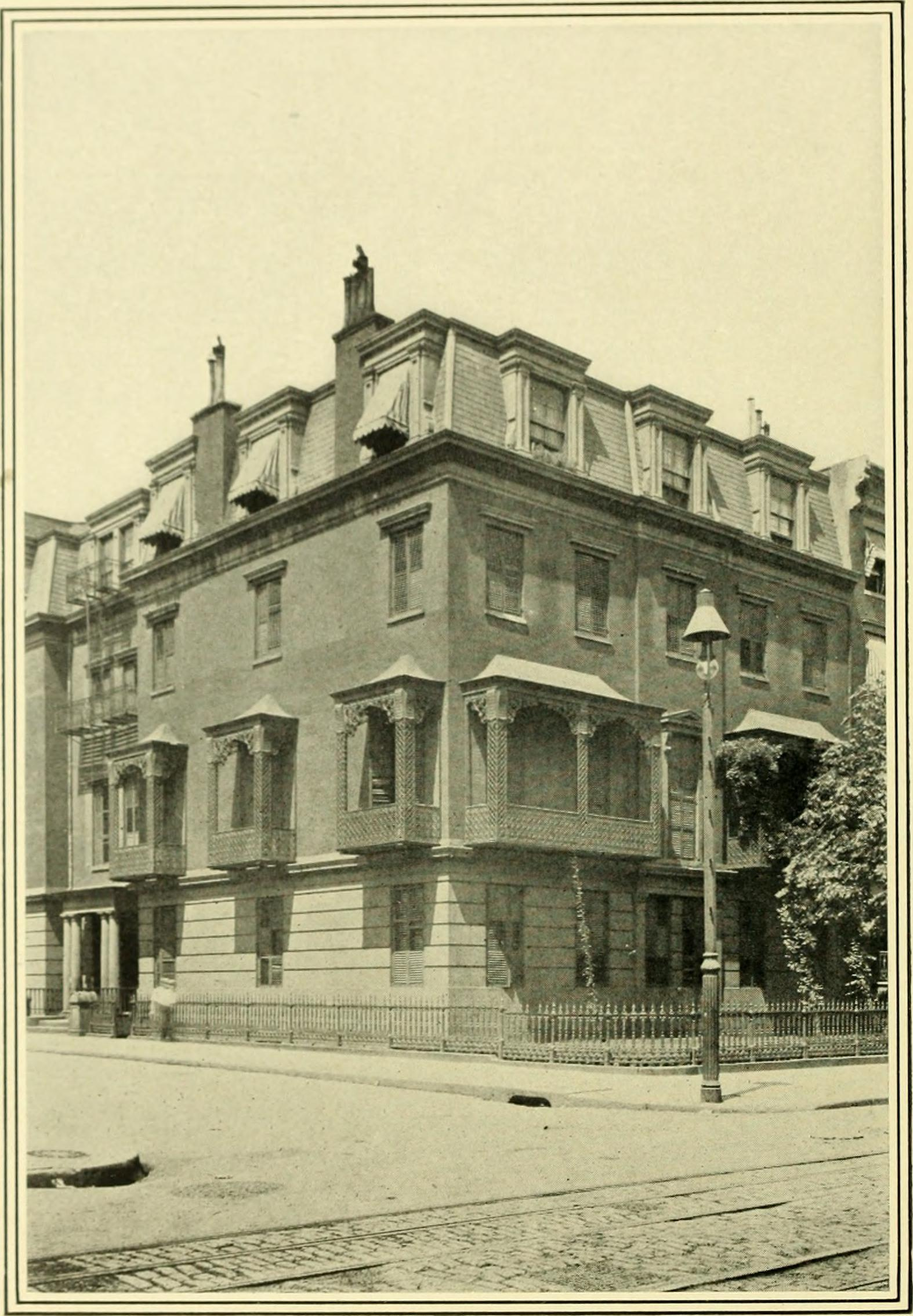
Rutherfurd's home in Manhattan

Portrait of his daughter, Margaret, by John Singer Sargent, 1883

On July 22, 1841, he married Margaret Stuyvesant Chanler (1820–1890), the daughter of the Rev. Dr. John White Chanler, an Episcopalian clergyman, and Elizabeth Shirreff Winthrop. Margaret's brother John Winthrop Chanler (1826–1877) was a U.S. representative, and her mother was a 2x great-granddaughter of Wait Winthrop and Joseph Dudley, both prominent colonial American figures. She was also the niece, and adopted daughter, of Helena (nee Rutherfurd) Stuyvesant and Peter Gerard Stuyvesant (1778–1847), the 2x great-grandson of Peter Stuyvesant, the last Dutch Director-General of New Netherland before it became New York, Together, they were the parents of:

- Rutherfurd Stuyvesant (1843–1909), who was married to Mary Rutherfurd Pierrepont (1842–1879). a granddaughter of Peter Augustus Jay. After her death, he married Countess Mathilde Elizabeth Loewenguth de Wassanaer (1877–1948) the widow of a Dutch Count.
- Helen Rutherfurd (1844–1845), who died young.
- Elizabeth Winthrop Rutherfurd (1847–1847), who died young.
- Margaret Stuyvesant Rutherfurd (1853–1916), who was married to Henry White (1850–1927), the U.S. Ambassador to France and Italy.
- Louisa Morris Rutherfurd (1855–1892)
- Lewis Morris Rutherfurd Jr. (1859–1901), who was married to Anne Harriman Vanderbilt (1861–1940).
- Winthrop Chanler Rutherfurd (1862–1944), who married Alice Morton (1879–1917), a daughter of former U.S. Vice President Levi Parsons Morton and Anna Livingston Reade Street. After her death, he married Lucy Mercer, a mistress of Franklin D. Roosevelt.

In 1887, his health began to fail. Rutherfurd died on May 30, 1892, at his home, Tranquility, New Jersey.

== Awards and honors ==
Richard Proctor, the greatest popularizer of astronomy in the nineteenth century, called Rutherfurd "the greatest lunar photographer of the age."

- The lunar crater Rutherfurd is named after him.
- A professorship in Columbia University's astronomy department is named in his honor, as is the astronomical observatory atop Columbia's Pupin Hall.
- He was made an associate of the Royal Astronomical Society of London
- He was made a Doctor of Law at the centennial celebration of Columbia in 1887.
