= Peter Gerard Stuyvesant =

American landowner and philanthropist (1778–1847)

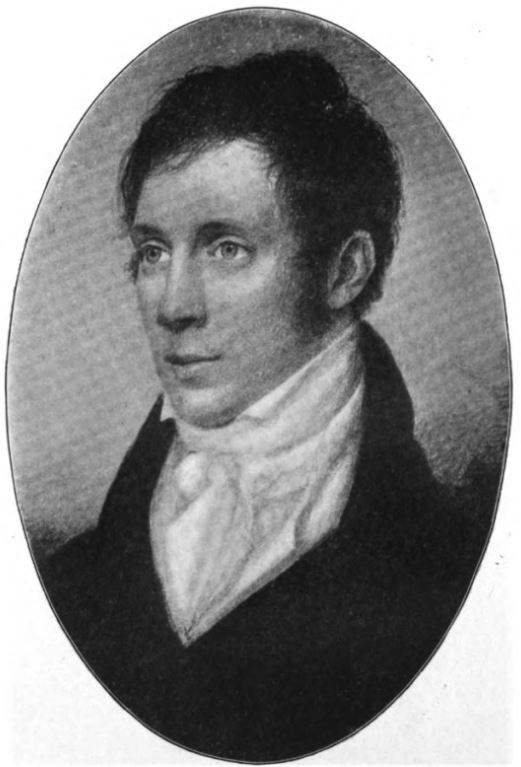

President of the New-York Historical Society
- In office 1836–1839
- Preceded by: Morgan Lewis
- Succeeded by: Peter Augustus Jay

President of the Saint Nicholas Society of the City of New York
- In office 1835–1836
- Preceded by: Inaugural holder
- Succeeded by: Gulian Crommelin Verplanck

Personal details
- Born: September 21, 1778 New York City, New York, U.S.
- Died: August 16, 1847 (aged 68) Niagara Falls, New York, U.S.
- Spouses: Susannah Barclay (m. 1803; died 1805) Helena Rutherfurd (after 1805)
- Relations: See Stuyvesant family Nicholas Fish (brother-in-law); Hamilton Fish (nephew); Pierre Van Cortlandt (uncle); Dirck Ten Broeck (brother-in-law)
- Children: Margaret Chanler Stuyvesant
- Parent(s): Peter Stuyvesant; Margaret Livingston
- Education: Columbia College (1794)

Peter Gerard Stuyvesant (/ˈstaɪv.əs.ənt/; September 21, 1778 – August 16, 1847) was an American landowner, philanthropist and descendant of Peter Stuyvesant who was prominent in New York society in the 1600s.

== Early life ==
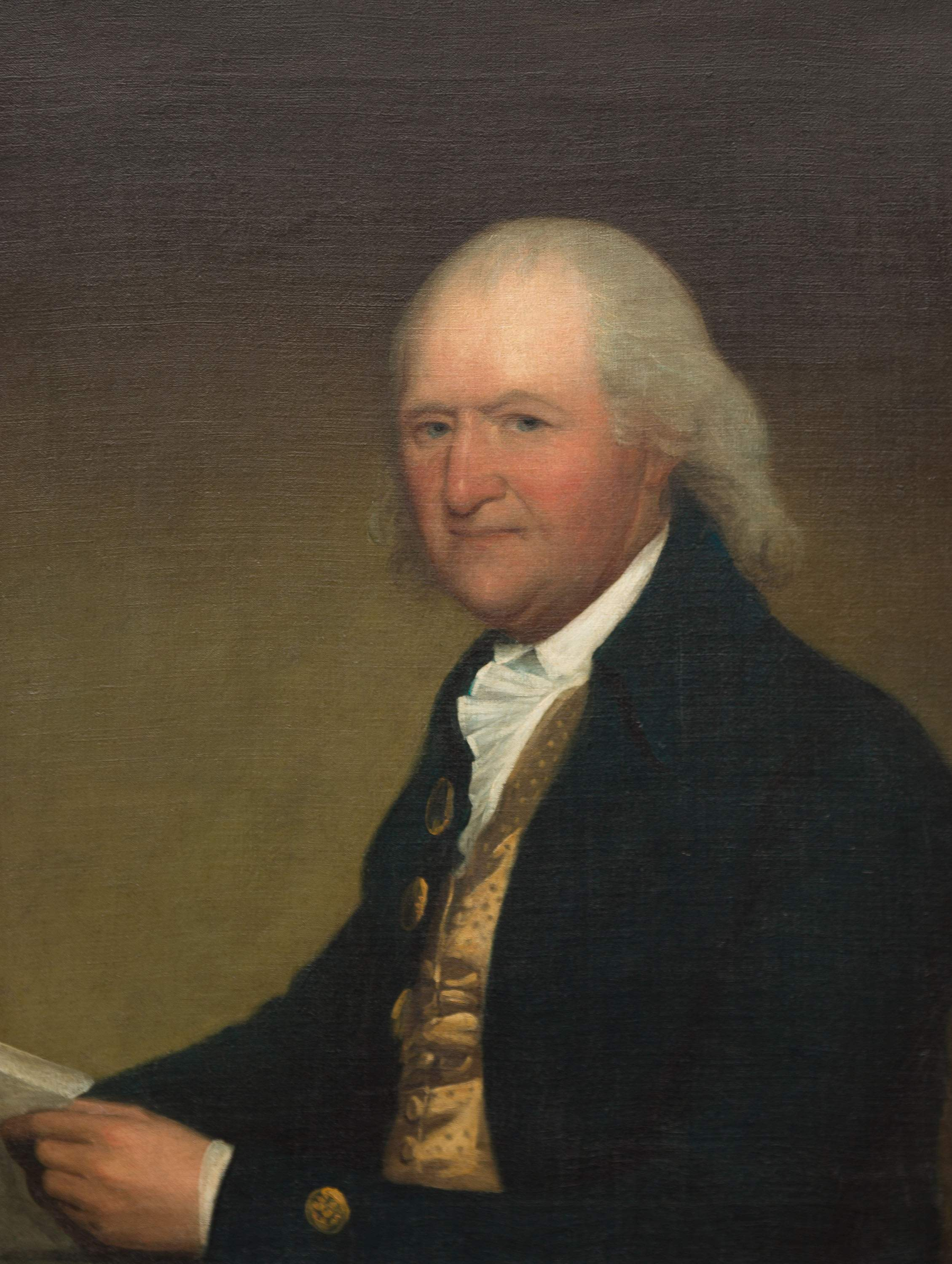
Portrait of his father, Peter Stuyvesant, by Gilbert Stuart

Stuyvesant was born in New York City on September 21, 1778. He was the son of Petrus "Peter" Stuyvesant (1727–1805) and Margaret (née Livingston) Stuyvesant (1738–1818). His siblings included Judith Stuyvesant, who married Benjamin Winthrop (grandparents of U.S. Representative John Winthrop Chanler); Cornelia Stuyvesant, who married Speaker of the New York State Assembly Dirck Ten Broeck, Nicholas William Stuyvesant, who married Catharine Livingston Reade, and Elizabeth Stuyvesant, who married Adjutant General of New York Nicholas Fish.

Peter was descended from many of New York's most prominent families and characters. Through his father, he was the 2x great grandson of Peter Stuyvesant, the last Dutch Director-General of New Netherland. His paternal grandparents (and his namesake) were Peter Gerard Stuyvesant and Judith (née Bayard) Stuyvesant of the Bayard family. Through his mother Margaret, he was descended from the Livingston and Beekman families, as she was the daughter of Gilbert Livingston and Cornelia (née Beekman) Livingston, granddaughter of Robert Livingston the Elder, the first Lord of Livingston Manor, and great-granddaughter of Wilhelmus Beekman (who arrived in New Amsterdam aboard the same ship as Peter Stuyvesant). His maternal aunt, Joanna Livingston, was married to Pierre Van Cortlandt, the first Lieutenant Governor of the New York.

== Career ==
Stuyvesant graduated from Columbia College in 1794. He then studied law and was admitted to the bar.

Stuyvesant was one of the largest and wealthiest land owners in New York City, second only to John Jacob Astor in terms of wealth and property in all of the United States. He owned the 60 acre Stuyvesant family bouwerie (or farm) which he developed into residential housing from Houston Street to 23rd Street. Stuyvesant lived in one of the Stuyvesant country homes, known as Petersfield, overlooking the East River between 16th and 17th Streets until 1825 when he sold the house and 200 lots for $100,000. He then built his home on the northwest corner of 11th Street and Second avenue directly opposite St. Mark's Church. In 1846, the then Mayor of New York, Philip Hone, wrote in his famous diary of having "dined with Stuyvesant in his splendid new house in the Second avenue near St Mark's Church."

Stuyvesant was a founder and the seventh president of the New-York Historical Society, serving from 1836 until 1839.

He was also a founder (along with author Washington Irving) and the first president of the Saint Nicholas Society of the City of New York, an organization of men who are descended from early inhabitants of the State of New York, serving from 1835 to 1836.

=== Stuyvesant Park ===
In 1836, Stuyvesant and his wife reserved four acres of the family farm and sold it to the City of New York, for five dollars, as a public park which was originally known as Holland Square, but later became Stuyvesant Square. The western boundary of the park, Rutherfurd Place, was named after his wife.

== Personal life ==
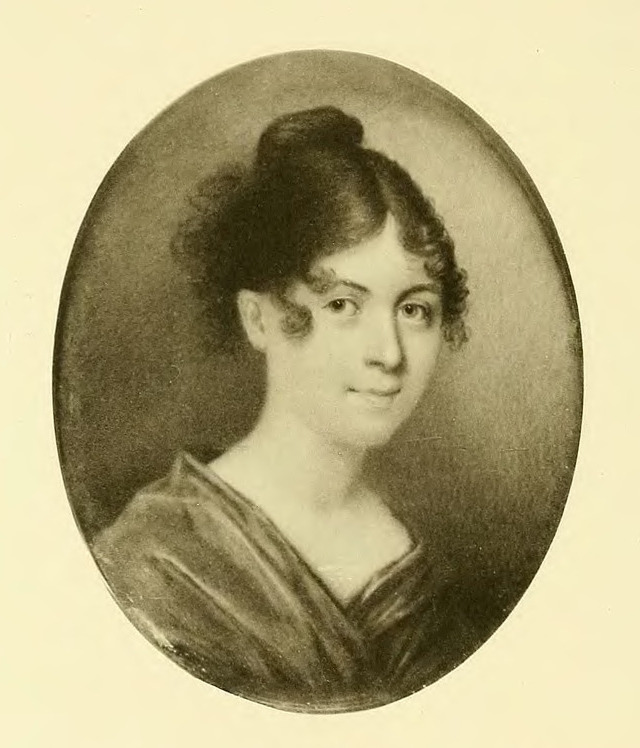
Helena Rutherfurd Stuyvesant

Stuyvesant was married twice. His first marriage was in 1803 to Susannah Barclay (1785–1805), the daughter of lawyer Thomas Henry Barclay, a Loyalist during the American Revolutionary War who became one of the United Empire Loyalists in Nova Scotia.

After his first wife's death in 1805, Stuyvesant was remarried to Helena Rutherfurd (1790–1873), daughter of U.S. Senator John Rutherfurd and Helena (née Morris) Rutherford, and granddaughter of Walter Rutherfurd and Continental Congressman Lewis Morris. Stuyvesant did not have any children with either wife, however, after his second marriage, the Stuyvesants adopted Helena's niece, Margaret Stuyvesant Chanler (1820–1890), who changed her name to Margaret Chanler Stuyvesant. She later married astronomer Lewis Morris Rutherfurd (1816–1892).

Stuyvesant, by then the reigning patriarch of the Stuyvesant family, died by accidental drowning on August 16, 1847, while visiting Niagara Falls, New York. Stuyvesant was buried in the cemetery at St. Mark's Church in-the-Bowery. His widow died in 1873; her funeral notice in The New York Times described her thusly: "The late Mrs. Stuyvesant was an exemplar of the sterling, hereditary virtues of the family, a devout Christian, given to charity and all good works. Her life was long, and she retained the vigor of an unclouded mind to the end. She took a practical interest in the literature and passing topics of the day, and won the hearts of all who had the good fortune to know her by the unselfishness of her disposition."

=== Estate and descendants ===
In 1847, to conform with Stuvyesant's will, four year old Stuyvesant Rutherfurd (1843–1909), the eldest son of his adopted daughter Margaret and her husband Lewis Morris Rutherford (and great-grandson of his sister Judith Stuyvesant Winthrop), changed his name to Rutherfurd Stuyvesant. in order to inherit a third of his Stuyvesant fortune, then estimated at $2,500,000 (equivalent to $86,384,000 in 2025). The other two thirds of his estate were left to Stuyvesant's nephews, Hamilton Fish (1808–1893) and Gerard Stuyvesant (1805–1859). Rutherfurd Stuyvesant later married Mary Pierrepont (1842–1879) (granddaughter of Peter Augustus Jay). After her death, he married Countess Mathilde Elizabeth Loewenguth de Wassanaer (1877–1948), with whom he had two sons.
