= Lucy Mercer Rutherfurd =

American socialite (1891–1948)

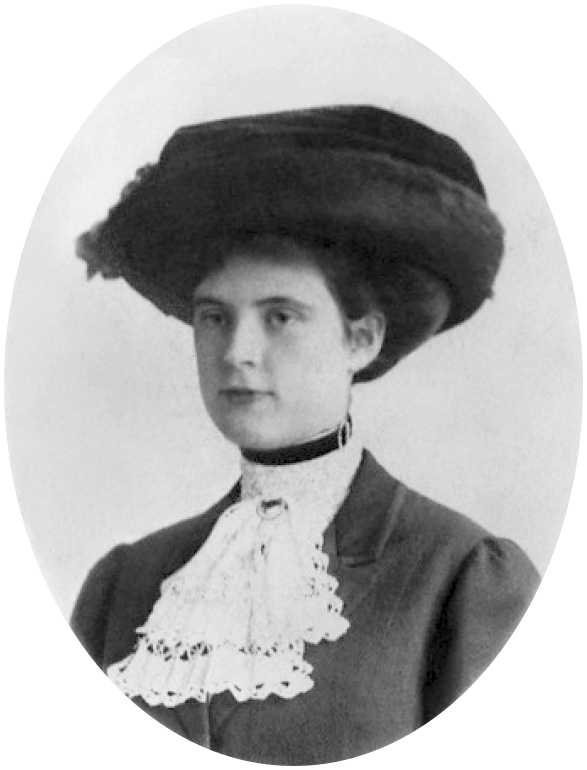
- Lucy Page Mercer, circa 1915
- Born: Lucy Page Mercer; April 26, 1891; Washington, D.C., United States
- Died: July 31, 1948 (aged 57)
- Occupations: Dress store worker, secretary
- Known for: Relationship with Franklin D. Roosevelt
- Spouse: Winthrop Rutherfurd (m. 1920; died 1944)
- Children: 1

Lucy Mercer Rutherfurd (née Lucy Page Mercer; April 26, 1891 – July 31, 1948) was an American woman who sustained a long affair with US president Franklin D. Roosevelt. Born to formerly rich parents, Mercer became secretary to Eleanor Roosevelt in 1914 and began an extensive affair with Franklin shortly thereafter. When Eleanor discovered the affair in 1918, she offered Franklin a divorce; but Franklin instead chose to separate from Mercer to preserve his political career.

After dismissal from the Roosevelt household, Mercer married New York socialite Winthrop Rutherfurd, but maintained contact with Franklin Roosevelt. Rutherfurd died in 1944, and Franklin began seeing Mercer again, through meetings arranged by his daughter Anna. Mercer was present at Roosevelt's fatal stroke, although the family successfully concealed Roosevelt's affair from the press until 1966.

== Background ==
Lucy Page Mercer was born on April 26, 1891, in Washington, D.C., to Carroll Mercer and Minna Leigh (Minnie) Tunis, an independent woman of "Bohemian" exotic, free-spirited tastes. Lucy had one sister, Violetta Carroll Mercer. Though they were both from wealthy, well-connected families, Mercer's parents lost their fortune through the Financial Panic of 1893 and subsequent great recession/depression which curtailed their lavish spending. The pair separated shortly after Lucy's birth, and Carroll became an alcoholic. Minnie then raised the girls alone. Carroll would later enlist in Theodore Roosevelt's "Rough Riders" cavalry unit in the brief Spanish–American War of 1898, campaigning near Santiago, Cuba.

== Affair with Franklin D. Roosevelt ==
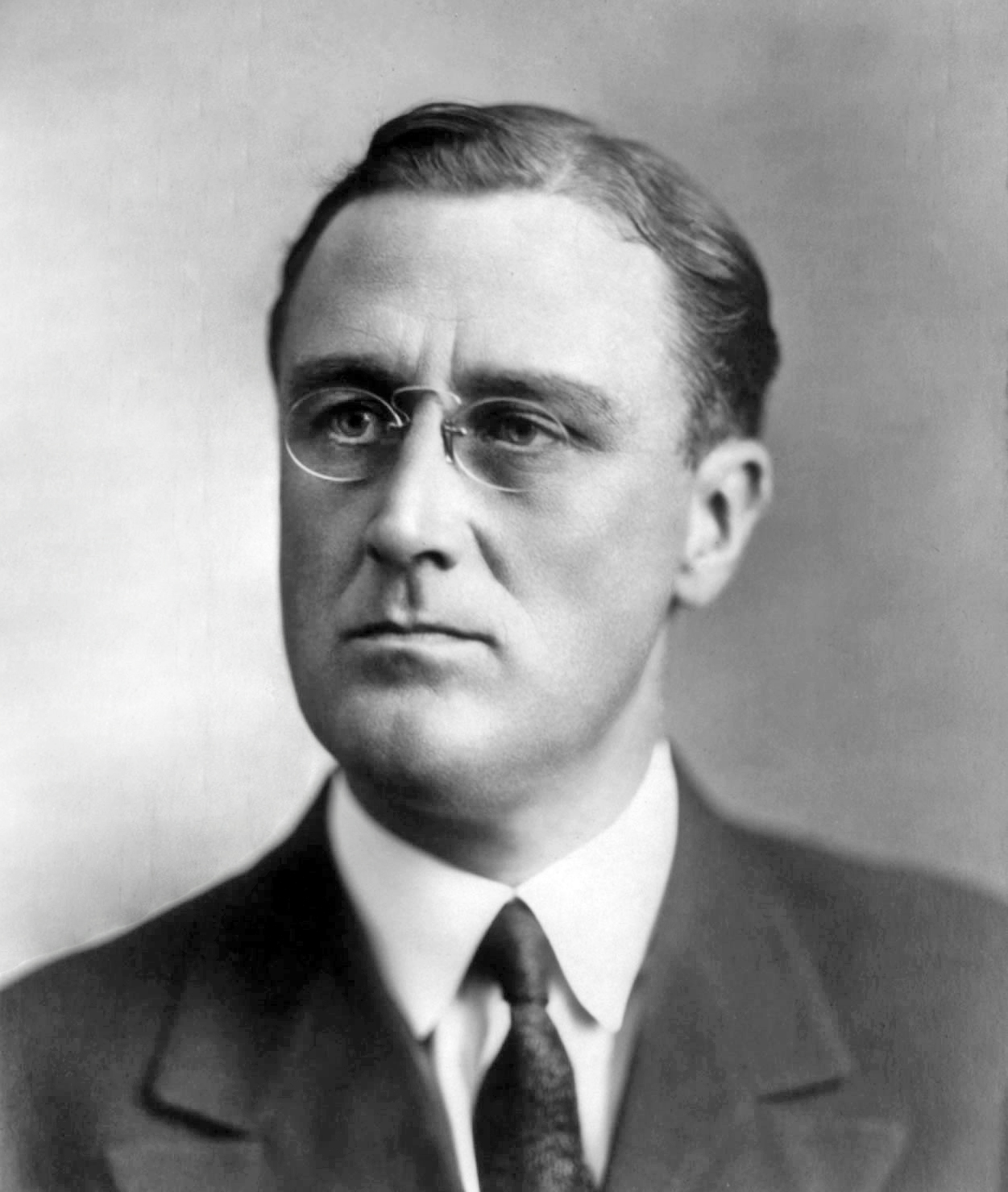
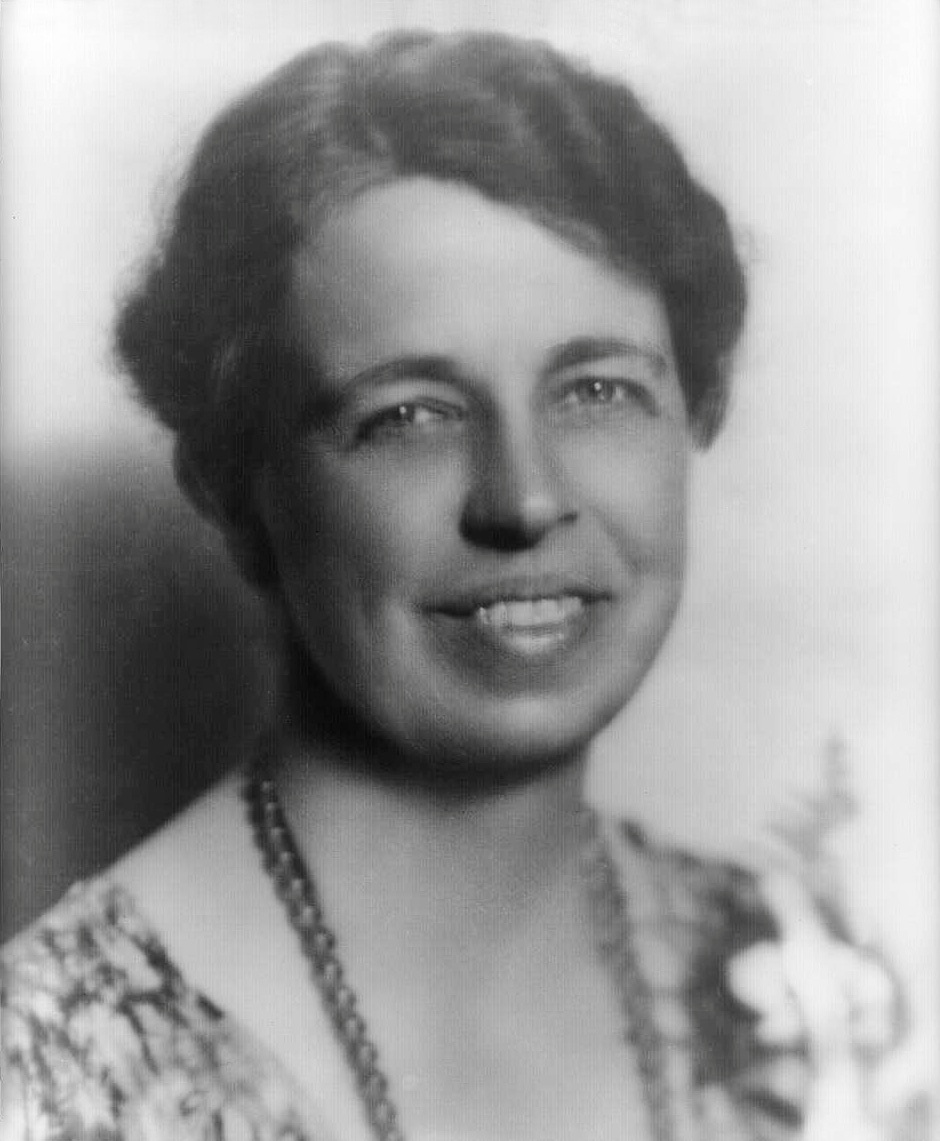
Franklin D. Roosevelt (c. 1919) and Eleanor Roosevelt (1933)

As a young woman, Lucy Mercer worked in a dress shop. In 1914, Mercer was hired by Eleanor Roosevelt to become her social secretary. She quickly became an established part of the Roosevelt household, and good friends with Eleanor. According to historians Joseph Persico and Hazel Rowley, the affair between Mercer and Franklin likely began in 1916, when Eleanor and the children were vacationing at Campobello Island to avoid the summer heat, while Franklin remained in Washington, D.C. In 1917, Franklin often included Mercer in his summer yachting parties, which Eleanor usually declined to attend.

In June 1917, Mercer quit or was fired from her job with Eleanor and enlisted in the US Navy, which was then mobilizing for World War I. Franklin was at that time the Assistant Secretary of the Navy, and Mercer was assigned to his office. Mercer and Franklin continued to see one another privately, causing widespread gossip in Washington. Alice Roosevelt Longworth—daughter of Theodore Roosevelt, and a cousin of Eleanor's—encouraged the affair, inviting Mercer and Franklin to dinner together several times. She later commented, "He deserved a good time. ... He was married to Eleanor."

In 1918, Franklin went on a trip to Europe to inspect naval facilities for the war. When he returned in September, sick with pneumonia in both lungs, Eleanor discovered a packet of love letters from Mercer in his suitcase. Eleanor subsequently offered her husband a divorce.

Franklin's mother, Sara Delano Roosevelt, was adamantly against the idea of divorce, however, as it would mark the end of Franklin's political career; she stated that she would cut him off from the family fortune if he chose separation. Historians have also debated whether, as a Roman Catholic, Mercer would have been willing to marry a divorced man. Eleanor Roosevelt biographer Blanche Wiesen Cook expressed skepticism that this had been a serious obstacle, noting the depth of Mercer's feelings. Author Persico also doubted that this was a factor, observing that Mercer's mother Minnie had divorced and remarried, and that the family had come to Roman Catholicism only recently.

In the end, Franklin appears to have told Mercer disingenuously that Eleanor was not willing to grant a divorce. He and Eleanor remained married, and he pledged never to see Mercer again. The Roosevelts' son James later described the state of the marriage after the incident as "an armed truce that endured until the day he died."

== Marriage and continued contact with Roosevelt ==
Mercer left Washington after the affair and became the governess for the children of Winthrop Rutherfurd (1862–1944), a wealthy New York socialite. Winthrop Rutherfurd had proposed to socialite Consuelo Vanderbilt (1877–1964) in 1896, only to see her social-climbing mother instead force her into marriage with Charles Spencer-Churchill, 9th Duke of Marlborough (1871–1934) (cousin to later British prime minister Winston Churchill).

Then in his fifties, Rutherfurd was considered one of society's most eligible widowers. On February 11, 1920, Mercer became his second wife. Franklin Roosevelt learned of the marriage by overhearing the news at a party. The Rutherfurds had one child, Barbara Mercer Rutherfurd (June 14, 1922 – November 6, 2005), who married Robert Winthrop "Bobby" Knowles Jr. in 1946.

Despite Roosevelt's promise to Eleanor, he kept in contact with Lucy Rutherfurd after her marriage, corresponding with her throughout the 1920s. Historian/author Persico speculates that these letters may have been the cause of the 1927 nervous breakdown of Roosevelt's long-time unmarried first secretary Marguerite "Missy" LeHand (1898–1944), as LeHand was also reputedly in love with Roosevelt and no medical cause for her breakdown was found.

In 1926, Roosevelt mailed Rutherfurd a copy of his first public lecture after his 1921 paralytic illness, privately dedicating it to her with an inscription. At his first presidential inauguration on March 4, 1933, Roosevelt made arrangements for Rutherfurd to attend and witness his swearing-in. When her husband later suffered a stroke, she contacted Roosevelt to arrange for him to be cared for at well-regarded Walter Reed Army Medical Center in Washington, D.C. Historian Doris Kearns Goodwin speculated that an entry in the White House usher's diary for August 1, 1941, included a code name for Lucy Rutherfurd, suggesting that she attended a private dinner with the president then.

Winthrop Rutherfurd died in March 1944 after a long illness. Rutherfurd met more frequently with Roosevelt in the months that followed. She arranged for her friend Elizabeth Shoumatoff (1888–1980), a well-known artist, to paint Roosevelt's portrait. In June 1944, Roosevelt requested that his daughter Anna, who was then managing some White House social functions and acting as hostess, help him arrange to meet Rutherfurd without Eleanor's knowledge. Aware of Rutherfurd's role in her parents' early marriage, Anna was at first angry that her father had put her in such a difficult position. However, she ultimately relented and set up a meeting in Georgetown.

To her surprise Anna immediately liked Rutherfurd, and the pair became friends. There were supposedly several dinners in the White House's second-floor private quarters during Roosevelt's last year which were attended by Rutherfurd in a group with Anna's presence and obvious acceptance. When, shortly after Roosevelt's death, Eleanor discovered Anna's role in arranging these meetings, the relationship between Eleanor and Anna became strained and cool for some time.

In early April 1945, Anna arranged for Rutherfurd to come over from her South Carolina estate in Aiken to meet her father at his "Little White House" in Warm Springs, Georgia, the small, plain, rustic cottage built at the polio therapy center by the heated mineral water springs resort that Roosevelt helped develop beginning in the 1920s. Rutherfurd and Shoumatoff, along with two female cousins, were sitting there while the artist worked on her painting of Roosevelt as he sat at a card table by the living room stone fireplace, fine-tuning a future speech and reading over some other papers on the early afternoon of April 12, 1945. In this quiet domestic scene as the two had just been smiling at each other, Roosevelt suddenly placed his hand up on his forehead and temple, saying "I have a terrific headache," then slumped over losing consciousness. Later, his two doctors – called in soon after the event – said he had suffered a fatal cerebral hemorrhage. Since a thorough medical exam a year earlier, he had received more intense care and concern from a young recently-recruited private physician. The two women, Rutherfurd and Shoumatoff, immediately packed and left the cottage. Eleanor nonetheless soon learned the truth from the cousins and felt doubly betrayed to learn of her daughter's role in the long-time deception. Finding Shoumatoff's unfinished watercolor among Franklin's possessions some time later, however, she mailed it to Rutherfurd, to which Rutherfurd responded with a warm letter of thanks and condolences.

In 1947, Rutherfurd's sister Violetta died by suicide after her husband requested a divorce, and a month later, on Christmas Day 1947, her mother Minnie died at age 84. Seven months later, Rutherfurd herself died from leukemia, aged 57, on July 31, 1948, having destroyed almost all of her correspondence with the president.

== Public revelation of affair ==
Following Roosevelt's death, his administration concealed Rutherfurd's presence at his death, fearing the scandal that would ensue. Shoumatoff's presence became known, and she gave a press conference to address questions but managed to hide Rutherfurd's role, which was not mentioned in post-war biographies or administration histories for almost two decades. Roosevelt's second private secretary Grace Tully (1900–1984), who had also been at Warm Springs at the time of his death, did briefly mention Rutherfurd's presence in her 1949 memoir F.D.R., My Boss, but gave no further hint of the relationship. Though it was reported several times in Eleanor's lifetime that Roosevelt had had a serious affair with an unnamed Catholic woman, it remained rumor for decades.

The Mercer–Roosevelt affair became wider public knowledge in 1966 when revealed in The Time Between the Wars, a memoir by Jonathan W. Daniels (1902–1981), a Roosevelt aide from 1943 to 1945. When the news of the memoir's contents broke, Franklin Delano Roosevelt Jr. (1914–1988), said that he had no knowledge of an affair between Rutherfurd and his father, while Rutherfurd's daughter Barbara flatly denied that any such romance had occurred. Historian Arthur Schlesinger Jr. (1917–2007) stated of the affair that if Rutherfurd "in any way helped Franklin Roosevelt sustain the frightful burdens of leadership in the second world war, the nation has good reason to be grateful to her."
