= Lewis Morris Rutherfurd Jr. =

American socialite and sportsman

- Born: March 31, 1859; New York City, New York, U.S.
- Died: January 5, 1901 (aged 41); Davos Platz, Graubünden, Switzerland
- Education: Columbia College
- Occupations: socialite, sportsman
- Spouse: Anne Harriman Sands (m. 1890)
- Children: 2, including Margaret, Princess Murat
- Parent(s): Lewis Morris Rutherfurd; Margaret Chanler Stuyvesant
- Relatives: Stuyvesant family

Lewis Morris Rutherfurd Jr. (March 31, 1859 – January 5, 1901) was an American socialite and sportsman from New York City known for breeding Fox Terrier dogs. He was also a member of the Stuyvesant family.

== Early life ==
Rutherford was born on March 31, 1859, in New York City. He was sixth of seven children born to Lewis Morris Rutherfurd (1816–1892), a prominent astronomer, and Margaret Chanler Stuyvesant (1820–1890) of the Stuyvesant family. His elder siblings included Stuyvesant Rutherfurd (1843–1909), Louisa Morris Rutherfurd (1855–1892), Margaret Stuyvesant Rutherfurd (1853-1916), who was married to Henry White, and Winthrop Rutherfurd (1862–1944), best known for his romance with Consuelo Vanderbilt and his marriage to Lucy Mercer, mistress to President Franklin D. Roosevelt.

His paternal grandparents were Robert Walter Rutherfurd (1788–1852) and Sabina Morris (1789–1857) of Morrisania. He was a great-grandson of U.S. Senator John Rutherfurd and 2x great-grandson of Lewis Morris, a signer of the Declaration of Independence. Rutherfurd was a descendant of Peter Stuyvesant, the last Dutch Director-General of New Netherland before it became New York, as well as John Winthrop, the first Governor of Massachusetts. His mother was the niece and adopted daughter of Peter Gerard Stuyvesant (1778–1847), a 2x great-grandson of Peter Stuyvesant and Helena Rutherfurd Stuyvesant. Through his mother, Rutherfurd was a nephew of Elizabeth Winthrop Chanler (1824–1904) and John Winthrop Chanler (1826–1877).

He was a graduate of Columbia College in 1882.

== Society life ==
Rutherfurd was a prominent social figure and known for his appreciation of sports, holding the championship of the Racquet Club for several years and widely known by automobilists.

He initiated the family's breeding of Fox Terrier dogs along with his brother Winthrop. Together, they owned the famous Rutherfurd Kennels in Allamuchy Township, New Jersey.

Rutherfurd was a member of the Union Club of New York, since 1886, and often frequented the Knickerbocker Club. He was a member of a "fraternity of young clubmen which a few years ago made as close knit a band as could be found of New York's representative good fellows" that included Woodbury Kane, Reginald Rives, F. Brockholst Cutting, William Cutting, William R. Travers (who married Rutherfurd's sister), and Winthrop Rutherfurd.

== Personal life ==
Coat of Arms of Lewis Morris Rutherfurd, Jr

On June 16, 1890, Rutherfurd was married to Anne Harriman Sands (1861–1940), the widow of Samuel Stevens Sands Jr. (1856–1889) and a daughter-in-law of banker Samuel Stevens Sands. Her own parents were banker Oliver Harriman (1829–1904) and Laura (née Low) Harriman (1834–1901). Anne's brothers were Oliver Harriman Jr., J. Borden Harriman, and Herbert M. Harriman, and the siblings were first cousins was E. H. Harriman. Together, Lewis and Anne were the parents of two daughters:

- Barbara Cairncross Rutherfurd (1895–1939), who married Cyril Hatch, son of Charles Henry Hatch, in 1916. They had once child, Rutherfurd L. Hatch (d. 1947), before divorcing in 1920. In 1924, she married Winfield Jesse Nicholls, a fellow follower of Oom the Omnipotent. After having two children, Guy Winfield Nicholls and Margaret Mary Nicholls, they divorced in 1930.
- Margaret Stuyvesant Rutherfurd (1891–1976), who first married Ogden Livingston Mills (1884–1937), Secretary of the Treasury. They divorced in 1919. In 1922, she married Sir Paul Henry Dukes (1889–1967). They divorced in 1929 and, later that same year, she married Prince Charles Michel Joachim Napoléon (1892–1973), son of Joachim, 5th Prince Murat. They also divorced and in 1939, she married Frederick Leybourne Sprague.

Rutherfurd died on January 5, 1901, at Davos Platz in Graubünden, Switzerland. He was buried in the family plot at Tranquility Cemetery in Tranquility, New Jersey near his family's estate known as "Tranquility".

After his death, his widow remarried to William Kissam Vanderbilt. They remained married until his 1920 death. Anne died on April 20, 1940.

== Bibliography ==
- Vanderbilt, Arthur T. (1991). Fortune's Children: The Fall of the House of Vanderbilt. HarperCollins. ISBN 9780688103866.
