= Harriman (surname) =

Harriman is a surname of English origin. Notable people with the surname include:

- W. Averell Harriman, Governor of New York, son of Edward
- Edward Henry Harriman (1848–1909), American railroad financier
- E. Roland Harriman, American railroad executive, son of Edward
- Florence Jaffray Harriman, American socialite, suffragist, social reformer, organizer, and diplomat
- Gladys Fries Harriman (1896–1983), American philanthropist, equestrian and big game hunter
- Henry Harriman (Mormon), President of the Seventy of the Church of Jesus Christ of Latter-day Saints
- Herbert M. Harriman (1873-1933), American heir, businessman and sportsman
- John Emery Harriman (1869—1916), American civil engineer and inventor
- John Harriman (botanist), English botanist
- J. Borden Harriman (1864-1914), American financier
- Oliver Harriman (1829-1904), American businessman
- Oliver Harriman, Jr. (1862-1940), American stockbroker
- Pamela Harriman, American socialite and diplomat
- Robert Hariman (born 1951), American scholar

Fictional characters:

- Delos D. Harriman, businessman and space entrepreneur in Robert A. Heinlein's stories Requiem and The Man Who Sold the Moon
- John Harriman (Star Trek), fictional captain of the starship Enterprise (NCC-1701-B) in the movie Star Trek Generations
