= Anne Harriman Vanderbilt =

American heiress (1861–1940)

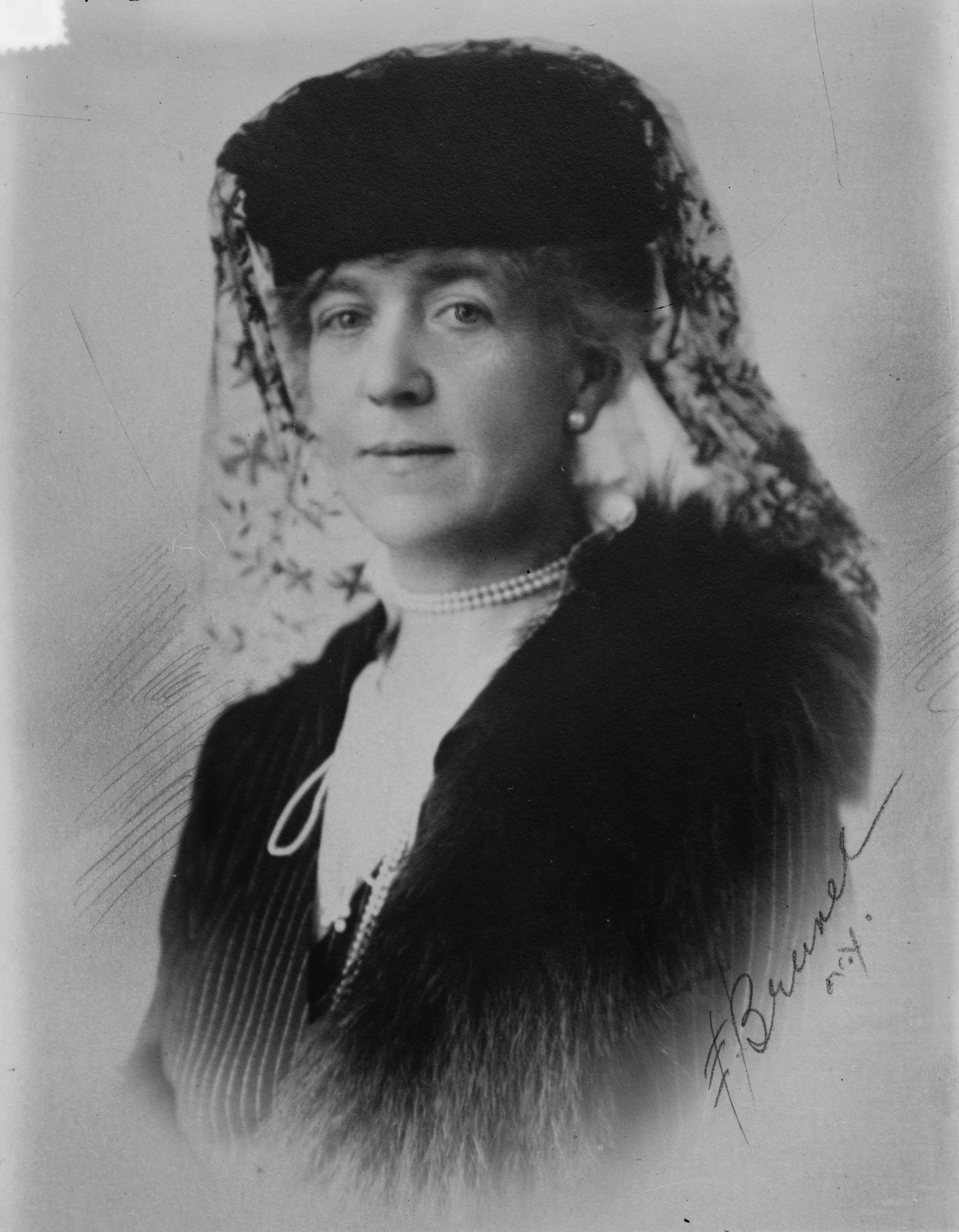
- Harriman, circa 1915
- Born: Anne Harriman; February 17, 1861; New York City, New York, U.S.
- Died: April 20, 1940 (aged 79); New York City, New York, U.S.
- Burial place: Moravian Cemetery
- Spouses: Samuel Stevens Sands Jr. (m. 1884; died 1889) Lewis Morris Rutherfurd Jr. (m. 1890; died 1901) William Kissam Vanderbilt (m. 1903; died 1920)
- Children: 4, including Margaret Stuyvesant Murat
- Parent(s): Oliver Harriman; Laura Low Harriman
- Relatives: Oliver Harriman Jr. (brother); J. Borden Harriman (brother); Herbert M. Harriman (brother); E. H. Harriman (cousin)
- Awards: Légion d'honneur

Anne Harriman Sands Rutherfurd Vanderbilt (February 17, 1861 – April 20, 1940) was an American heiress of the wealthy Harriman family. She was known for her marriages to prominent men and her role in the development of the Sutton Place neighborhood as a fashionable place to live.

== Early life ==
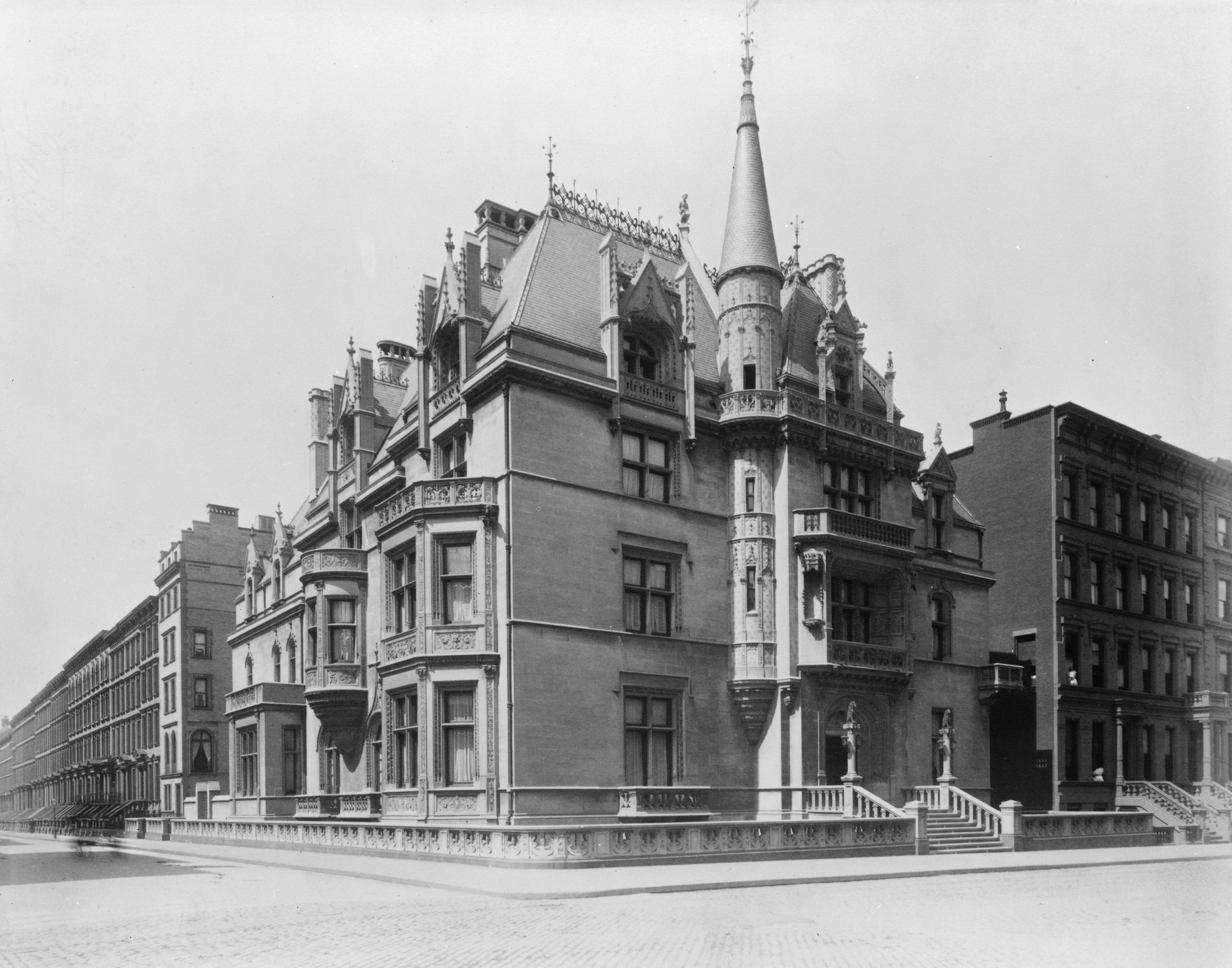
The William K. Vanderbilt House on Fifth Avenue, New York City. Although originally the house of W.K. Vanderbilt, Alva Erskine Smith maintained ownership of the Petit Chateau after she divorced W.K. Vanderbilt in 1895. She would also keep the Marble House in Newport, and custody of the couples 3 children. Anne Harriman Vanderbilt never resided in 660 5th Avenue.

Anne Harriman was born on February 17, 1861. She was one of eight children born to banker Oliver Harriman (1829–1904) and Laura (née Low) Harriman (1834–1901). Her siblings included Oliver Harriman Jr. (1862–1940), J. Borden Harriman (1864–1914), and Herbert M. Harriman (1873–1933). Her first cousin, E. H. Harriman, was the father of Governor W. Averell Harriman.

== Society life ==
In 1903, along with Anne Morgan and Elisabeth Marbury, Anne helped organize the Colony Club, the first women's social club in New York. They engaged Stanford White, then New York's most famous architect, to design the interiors of the club.

Anne was also known for her philanthropy and for devoting "herself to those less fortunate". She financed the construction of the "open-stair" apartment houses, four large buildings that contained almost 400 apartments on what is now York Avenue in Manhattan. The buildings were created to house tuberculosis patients. Vanderbilt donated $1,000,000 and the buildings were completed in 1910.

In 1916, she hosted a fundraiser for the war sufferers of Venice.

In 1919, she was made a Knight of the Légion d'honneur by the French government and in 1932, she received the rank of Officer of the Légion d'honneur.

=== Residences ===
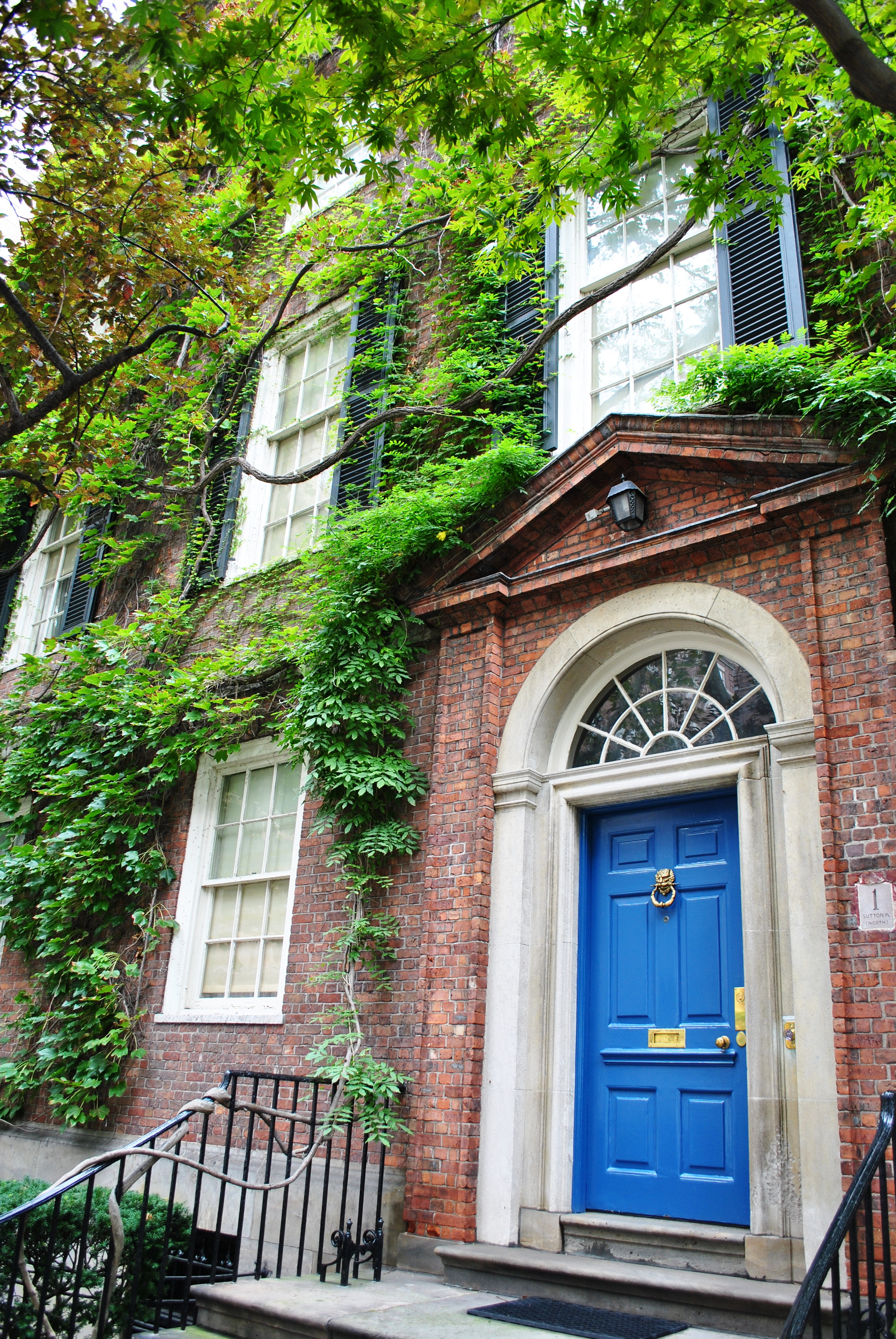
1 Sutton Place North

In 1921, she also sold their country home, "Stepping Stones", in Wheatley Hills in Jericho on Long Island for $500,000 to Ormond Gerald Smith. The estate was around 125 acres and had a home commissioned by her late husband and designed by John R. Hill.

In 1921, Anne then purchased the former home of Effingham B. Sutton, at 1 Sutton Place, for $50,000 in the then-new neighborhood of Sutton Place, also in Manhattan. Before her move, along with Elizabeth Marbury, Anne Morgan, her sister, Emeline Harriman Olin, second wife of Stephen Henry Olin, the neighborhood was known as a squalid place. Vanderbilt, Marbury, and Morgan each hired Mott B. Schmidt (1889–1977), an American architect best known for his buildings in the American Georgian Classical style, to build, or in Vanderbilt's case, renovate homes in the neighborhood. The society pages of The New York Times scoffed at their relocation and referred to the areas as an "Amazon Enclave."

Mott transformed the home into a thirteen-room townhouse with terraced gardens that overlooked the East River. The cost of the home renovation was approximately $75,000 in 1921. Vanderbilt had Elsie de Wolfe design the interiors. The terrace, done by Renee Prahar, featured two center pillars with ornamental monkeys holding globes of light in their hands. By January 1929, The New York Times changed their tune and wrote:

Five years ago, when Mrs. William K. Vanderbilt established her residence in Sutton Place overlooking the East River, it was little dreamed that within so short a time such a marked migration from mid-Manhattan to the East River district would occur as is now in full swing. In the unbroken line of new apartments, lining Fifty-seventh Street almost solidly from Second Avenue to Sutton Place, those who doubted the wisdom of Mrs. Vanderbilt's move have found a convincing answer to their conjectures as to the ultimate success of the Sutton Place movement.

== Marriages ==
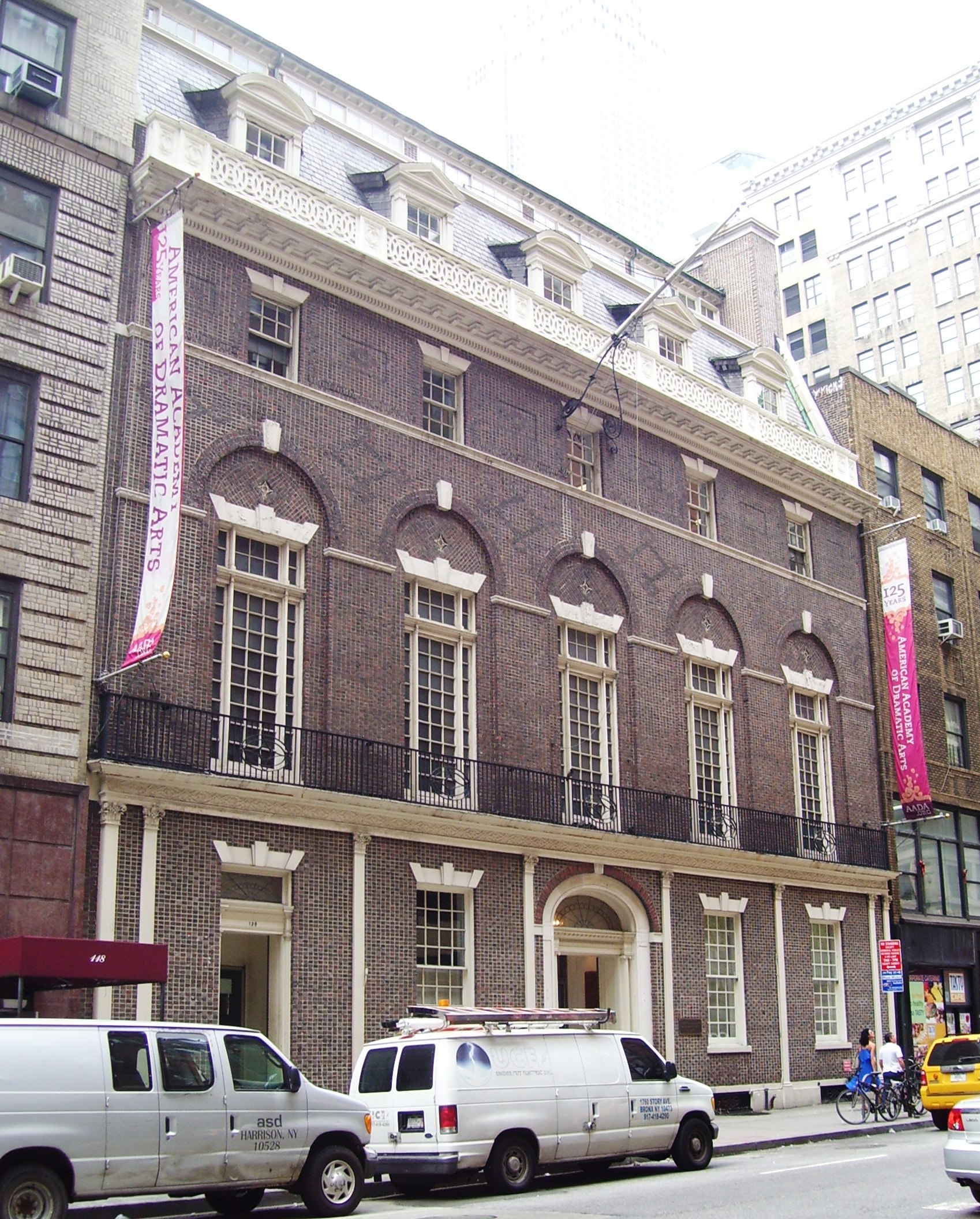
First Colony Club House, New York City

She married firstly sportsman Samuel Stevens Sands Jr. (1856–1889), a son of Samuel Stevens Sands (1827–1892), the head of S.S. Sands Co. Before his death from a fall during a hunt at Meadow Brook Golf Club, she had two sons by Sands:

- Samuel Stevens Sands III (1884–1913), who married Gertrude Sheldon, daughter of Mary Seney Sheldon and George R. Sheldon, in 1910.
- George Winthrop Sands (1885–1908), who was married to Tayo Newton, daughter of Dr. B. Newton of New York, in 1905.

Her second marriage was on June 16, 1890, to Lewis Morris Rutherfurd Jr. (1859–1901), son of the astronomer Lewis Morris Rutherfurd and brother to Winthrop Rutherfurd. Before his death, she had two daughters by Rutherford:

- Barbara Cairncross Rutherfurd (1895–1939), who married Cyril Hatch, son of Charles Henry Hatch, in 1916. They had one child, Rutherfurd L. Hatch (d. 1947), before divorcing in 1920. In 1924, she married Winfield Jesse Nicholls, a fellow follower of Oom the Omnipotent. After having two children, Guy Winfield Nicholls and Margaret Mary Nicholls, they divorced in 1930.
- Margaret Stuyvesant Rutherfurd (1891–1976), who first married Ogden Livingston Mills (1884–1937), Secretary of the Treasury. They divorced in 1919. In 1922, she married Sir Paul Henry Dukes (1889–1967). They divorced in 1929 and, later that same year, she married Prince Charles Michel Joachim Napoléon (1892–1973), son of Joachim, 5th Prince Murat. They also divorced and in 1939, she married Frederick Leybourne Sprague.

On April 29, 1903, she married her third husband, William Kissam Vanderbilt (1849–1920), in London. Vanderbilt was a son of William Henry Vanderbilt of the Vanderbilt family and Maria Louisa Kissam. They remained married until his death. She had no children with Vanderbilt.

=== Death and burial ===
Anne died on April 20, 1940. She was buried inside the Vanderbilt mausoleum at the Moravian Cemetery, designed by Richard Morris Hunt and constructed in 1885–1886, part of the family's private section within the cemetery. Their mausoleum is a replica of a Romanesque church in Arles, France. The landscaped grounds around the Vanderbilt mausoleum were designed by Frederick Law Olmsted. The Vanderbilt section is not open to the public.
