= Joseph Wright Harriman =

President of Harriman National Bank and Trust Company

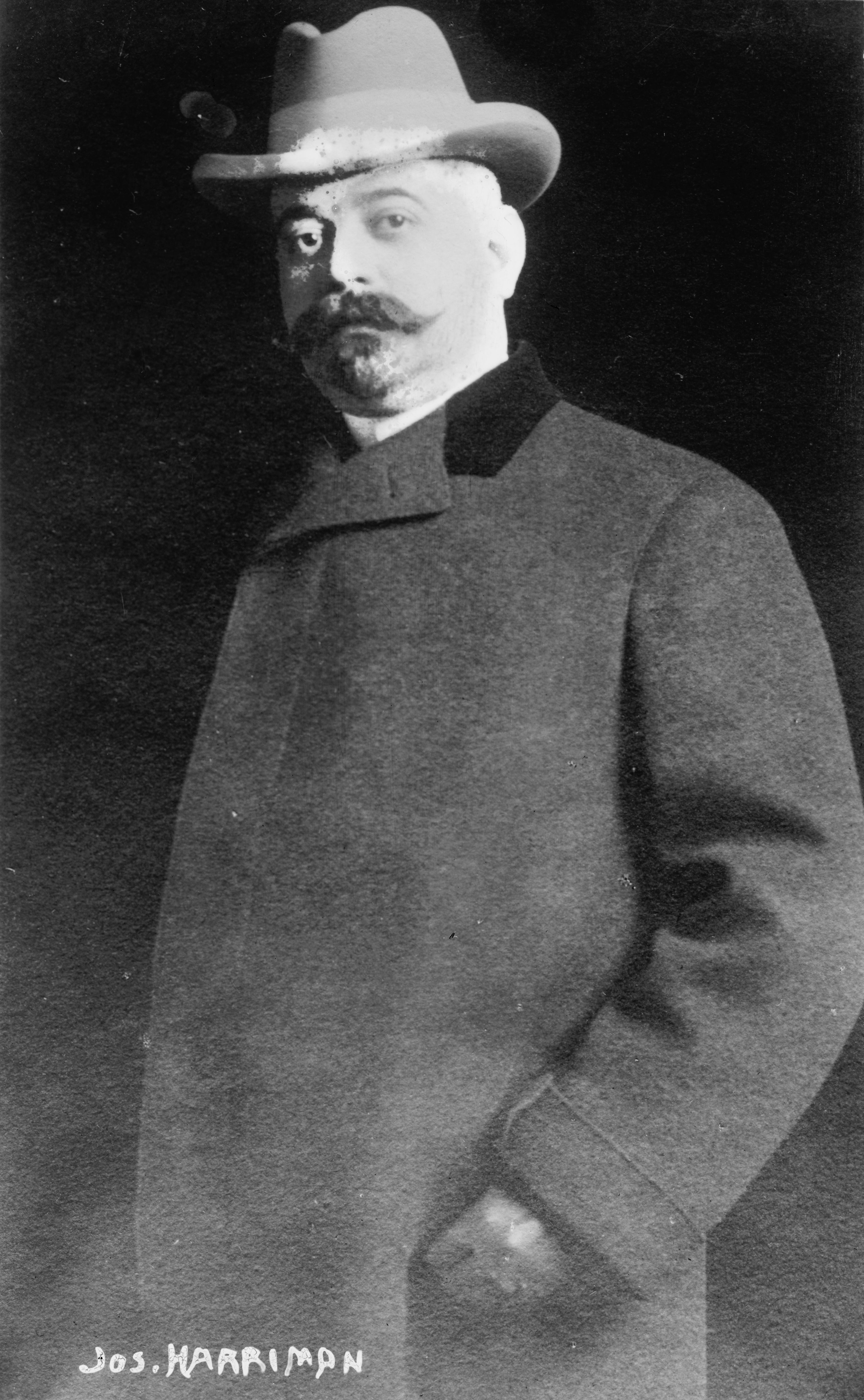
- Harriman between c. 1910 and c. 1915
- Born: January 31, 1867; Belleville, New Jersey, U.S.
- Died: January 23, 1949 (aged 81)
- Resting place: Locust Valley Cemetery, Locust Valley, New York, U.S.
- Education: Stevens Institute of Technology
- Occupation: Businessman
- Spouse: Augusta Barney
- Children: 1 son, 1 daughter
- Parent(s): John Nielson Harriman; Elizabeth Grainger Hancox
- Relatives: Edward H. Harriman (paternal uncle); W. Averell Harriman (cousin)

Joseph Wright Harriman (January 31, 1867 – January 23, 1949) was the president of Harriman National Bank and Trust Company and member of the wealthy Harriman family. He was the nephew of railroad tycoon Edward H. Harriman and cousin of diplomat, statesman and future New York Governor W. Averell Harriman. In 1934, he was convicted of bank fraud and sent to Lewisburg Federal Penitentiary, where he served 25 months of his 4 1/2-year sentence before receiving parole. Between his arraignment and the start of his trial, Harriman twice walked away from care facilities, and his attorneys tried, without success, to establish that he was incompetent to stand trial.

== Personal background and family ==
He was born on January 31, 1867, in Belleville, New Jersey, the son of John Nielson Harriman (older brother of New York railroad tycoon Edward Henry Harriman) and his wife, Elizabeth Grainger Hancox Harriman. In 1885, after graduating from the Charlier Institute (a preparatory school for boys in New York City), then from the Stevens Institute of Technology, he joined the United States National Bank, where he became an assistant cashier. In 1894, he left that position to accept the same title with the Merchants' National Bank of New York. After being promoted to cashier of that bank in 1896, he left the bank in 1901 to join Harriman & Co., the investment banking firm established in 1869 by his uncle Oliver Harriman, and which was at the time owned by his cousins J. Borden Harriman and Oliver Harriman Jr.

He served in the Seventh Regiment of the New York National Guard from 1887 to 1892.

He married Augusta Barney on November 21, 1892. They had a son, Alan, and a daughter, Miriam. Their son died from complications of an auto accident on Long Island, New York, on January 7, 1928. Miriam wed Wall Street attorney Boykin Cabell Wright, future name partner in Shearman, Sterling & Wright, in September 1926.

He maintained an estate in Brookville, New York, on Long Island known as "Avondale Farms".

== The Harriman National Bank ==
The Day and Night Bank, the world's first 24-hour bank, was founded in 1906 as a state-chartered bank, with substantial involvement of J.W. Harriman (its initial vice-president) and other members of the Harriman family. In 1911, after the Day and Night Bank began to restrict its hours, it was renamed and rechartered as the Harriman National Bank, and reorganized with an increased involvement of Merchants' National Bank. The new board elected Joseph as the Bank's president, a position he would hold until 1932.

=== Collapse ===
During the first years of the Great Depression, the Harriman Bank was part of a clearing house committee of nine New York banks that vowed to provide each other with financial support. In July 1932, as the condition of the Harriman bank deteriorated, Joseph Harriman was eased out of his position as the bank's president, but remained chairman of the board. While most other banks were given licenses from the Federal Reserve Bank to re-open after the "bank holiday" of 1933, Harriman's bank was not so fortunate. In October 1933, the U.S. Treasury Department placed the Harriman Bank in a receivership. The bank's liabilities, including to depositors, exceeded its assets by $3.3 million to $5 million. The federal government would sue banks that were members of the clearing house committee, in an attempt to recover on behalf of depositors of the Harriman Bank's losses.

== Harriman's arraignment, flights, trial and conviction ==
=== Arraignment ===
Harriman was arraigned in his home on March 14, 1933, just as the bank holiday came to an end. He was charged with causing falsification of the bank's books, making unauthorized charges against the accounts of depositors (such as the owners of the New York Giants baseball team) so that he could finance his own purchases of the bank's stock. His motive, it was alleged, was to maintain the value of the bank's stock at the same level it had achieved before the stock market crash of 1929, even as earnings plummeted. Without leaving his bed, Harriman signed a $25,000 bail bond, and thereby remained out of custody.

Harriman retained as his lead trial attorney former U.S. Attorney (and future spymaster) William "Wild Bill" Donovan.

=== Flights ===
At the time of his arraignment, Harriman was said to be "critically ill with coronary thrombosis". On May 18, 1933, as his federal trial was about to begin, he walked away from a Manhattan nursing home where he claimed to have been undergoing treatment for a nervous breakdown, leaving behind a set of suicide notes. After he was found the next evening in a Roslyn, New York, hotel, pretending to be someone else, he stabbed himself in the neck and breast in an apparent suicide attempt. Doctors treating his injuries concluded that his heart was in "perfectly normal condition" for a man of his age.

Before the jury trial could begin, Donovan requested and received a hearing before Judge Francis Gordon Caffey regarding his client's competency to stand trial. Less than a week into that hearing, however, Harriman again disappeared from his nursing home. He reappeared two days later, dripping wet and claiming to have lived in Central Park, and was then confined behind bars in Bellevue Hospital. Donovon retained as his chief psychiatric expert Dr. Smith Ely Jelliffe, whose testimony had assisted Harry K. Thaw to avoid capital punishment for the killing of Stanford White, and Bianca de Saulles to avoid conviction for murdering her husband John de Saulles. U.S. Attorney George Medalie's cross-examination of Dr. Jelliffe is considered a masterpiece, and is the subject of a chapter of the revised edition of Francis Wellman's book "The Art of Cross-Examination". On November 24, 1933, Judge Caffey found Harriman competent to stand trial.

=== Trial ===
The jury trial did not begin until May 1934. Harriman and a co-defendant, Harriman Bank vice-president Albert M. Austin, were tried together. Victims of the alleged fraud, including movie stars Constance Talmadge and Peggy Hopkins Joyce, appeared to testify that they had not consented to the withdrawals from their accounts that the defendants arranged. After five weeks of testimony, the jury deliberated only two hours before finding Harriman guilty on all sixteen counts (and acquitting Austin). Judge John C. Knox sentenced Harriman to 4½ years on each count, but allowed him to serve them concurrently rather than consecutively.

=== Imprisonment ===
His imprisonment at the federal prison at Lewisburg, Pennsylvania, began on July 9, 1934. Working in the prison as a library clerk, Harriman was a "model prisoner", according to the warden. Harriman was paroled on August 27, 1936, after more than two years in jail.

== After prison ==
Following his release, Harriman worked at the Long Island auto sales business that his son Alan had established before his death. Notwithstanding his physical and mental condition, he outlived the rest of his immediate family. His wife Augusta died in 1939. His daughter Miriam died in 1947. He died on January 23, 1949. Joseph is buried in Locust Valley Cemetery, Locust Valley, New York.
