= Edward Harriman Memorial =

Memorial at the Utah State Capitol in Salt Lake City, U.S.

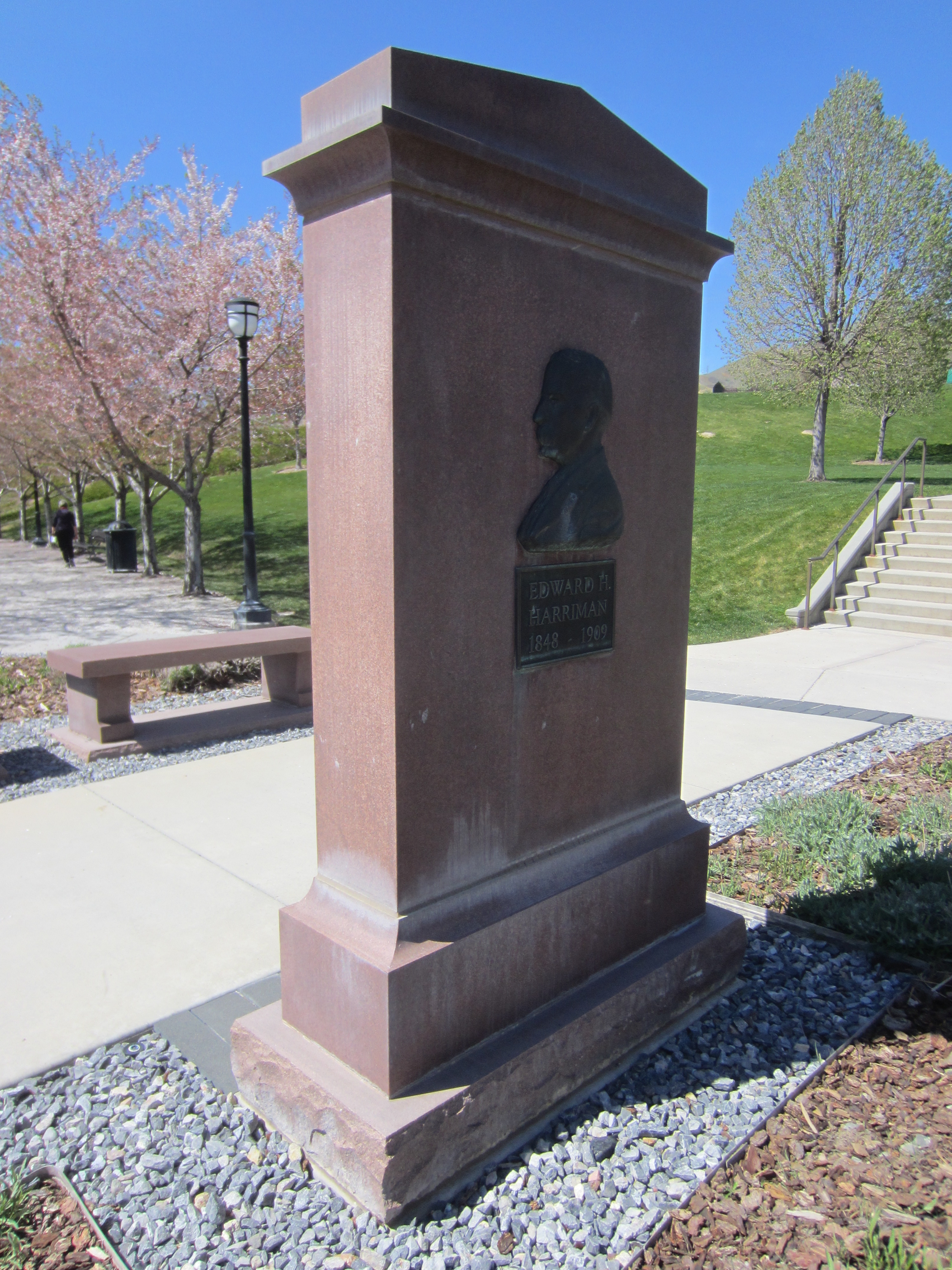
- The memoria in 2021
- Location: Utah State Capitol, Salt Lake City, Utah
- Coordinates: 40°46′45.7″N 111°53′13.5″W
- Dedicated to: E. H. Harriman

The Edward Harriman Memorial is installed outside the Utah State Capitol in Salt Lake City, in the U.S. state of Utah.

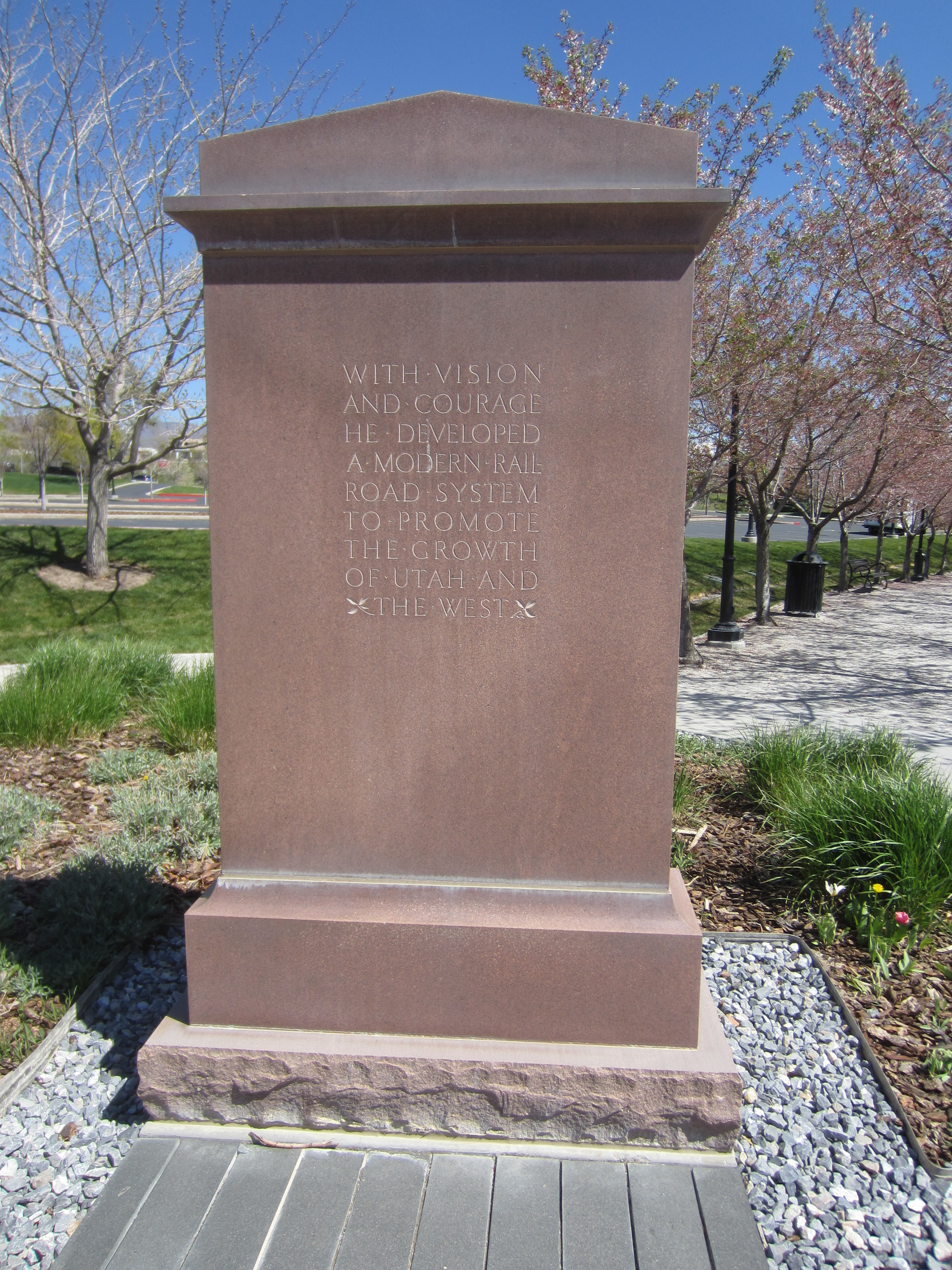
Inscription
