= Margaret Stuyvesant Murat =

American heiress, dancer and actress

Margaret, Princess Murat
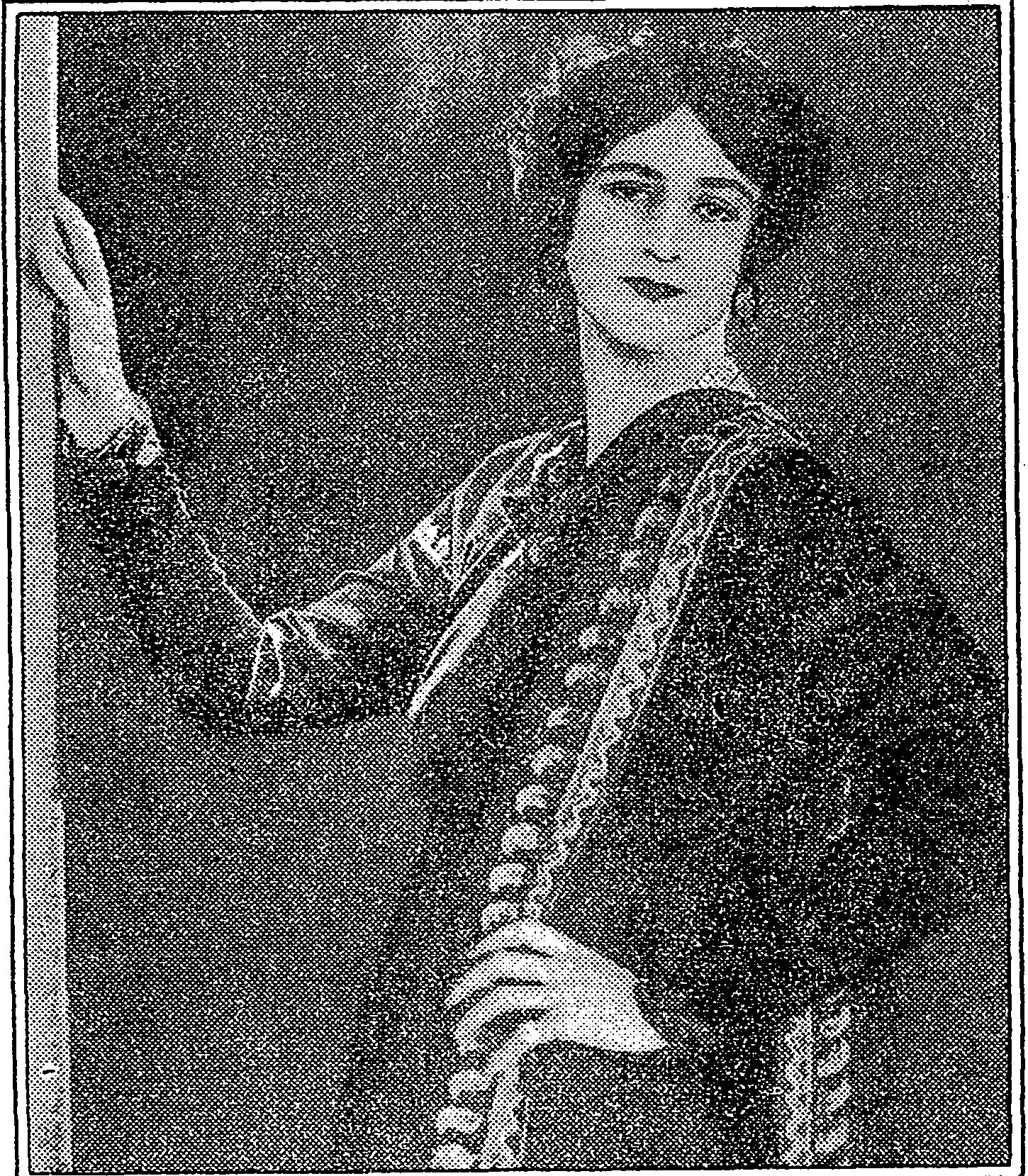
- Photograph from a 1928 article in the New York Times
- Born: Margaret Stuyvesant Rutherfurd; November 11, 1891; New York City, U.S.
- Died: February 10, 1976 (aged 84); Paris, France
- Spouses: Ogden Livingston Mills (m. 1911; div. 1919) Sir Paul Henry Dukes (m. 1922; div. 1929) Prince Charles Murat (m. 1929; div. 1939) Frederick Leybourne Sprague (m. 1939; div. 1941) Frederick Leybourne Sprague (m. 1941; div. 1942) Prince Charles Murat (m. 1945; died 1973)
- Parent(s): Lewis Morris Rutherfurd Jr. Anne Harriman Vanderbilt

Margaret Stuyvesant Rutherfurd Murat (November 11, 1891 – February 10, 1976) was an eccentric American heiress, dancer and sometime actress.

== Early life ==
Margaret was born on November 11, 1891, in Manhattan. She was the second daughter of Lewis Morris Rutherfurd Jr. (1859–1901) and Anne (née Harriman) Sands Rutherfurd (1861–1940). After her father's death in 1901, her mother remarried to William Kissam Vanderbilt, the first husband of Alva Erskine Smith. From her mother's marriage to Vanderbilt, she was a stepsister of Consuelo Vanderbilt (wife of Charles Spencer-Churchill, 9th Duke of Marlborough), William Kissam Vanderbilt II (husband of Virginia Fair Vanderbilt), and Harold Stirling Vanderbilt (wife of Gertrude Conaway Vanderbilt).

Her paternal grandparents were astronomer Lewis Morris Rutherfurd and Margaret Chanler (née Stuyvesant) Rutherfurd, the niece and adopted daughter of Peter Gerard Stuyvesant. Her paternal uncle was Winthrop Rutherfurd. Her maternal grandparents were Oliver Harriman and Laura (née Low) Harriman.

== Stage career ==
After her marriage to Sir Paul Henry Dukes, Lady Dukes became involved in the New Thought Movement which was based in New York. Like her older sister, she was a follower of Oom the Omnipotent.

She appeared on the New York stage professionally. She was a member of the cast of Gavrilov's ballet, Her Majesty's Escapade at the Gallo Theatre, appearing under her maiden name, Margaret Stuyvesant Rutherfurd. She also studied dancing with the members of the Diaghlieff troupe in London, Paris and Monte Carlo.

== Personal life ==
Margaret was married six times to four different men. On September 20, 1911, she married her first husband, Ogden Livingston Mills (1884–1937) at her stepfather's Château Du Quesney in Vatteville-la-Rue, France. He was a son of financier Ogden Mills, They divorced in Paris in May 1919 and he later became a U.S. Representative from New York and the U.S. Secretary of the Treasury.

In 1922, she married Sir Paul Henry Dukes (1889–1967), in Nyack, New York. Dukes was a British MI6 officer who had been knighted by King George V in 1920, calling Dukes the "greatest of all soldiers". Among his siblings were playwright Ashley Dukes and the physician Cuthbert Dukes. After their marriage, the Dukes lived at 180 Riverside Drive in New York before divorcing in January 1929.

In July 1929, she married Prince Charles Michel Joachim Napoléon (1892–1973) at the Church of St. Francois the Savior in Paris with Jacques Balsan (the second husband of her stepsister Consuelo) as a witness. Prince Charles, a son of Joachim, 5th Prince Murat and younger brother of Joachim, 6th Prince Murat, was a direct descendant of Joachim Murat who was crowned King of Naples by his brother-in-law Napoleon. They spent most of their marriage in Africa before they divorced in 1939 after she met her next husband painting flowers in her mother's garden.

On October 25, 1939, she married portrait painter Frederick Leybourne Sprague (1907–1993) at a private ceremony in Lynbrook on Long Island. Frederick was a son of Freeman Taylor Sprague of Manasquan, New Jersey. After the marriage, she dyed her hair pink, and lived a bohemian life in Camden, Maine. She divorced Sprague in Carson City, Nevada, in early 1941, only to turn around and marry him again, the second marriage lasting for less than a year.

In 1945, she again married Prince Murat. They remained married until his death in Morocco in 1973.

She died on February 10, 1976, aged 84, in Paris, France. She was buried alongside Prince Murat in the Murat family vault in Paris.
