= Paul Dukes =

British spy and author

Sir Paul Dukes KBE
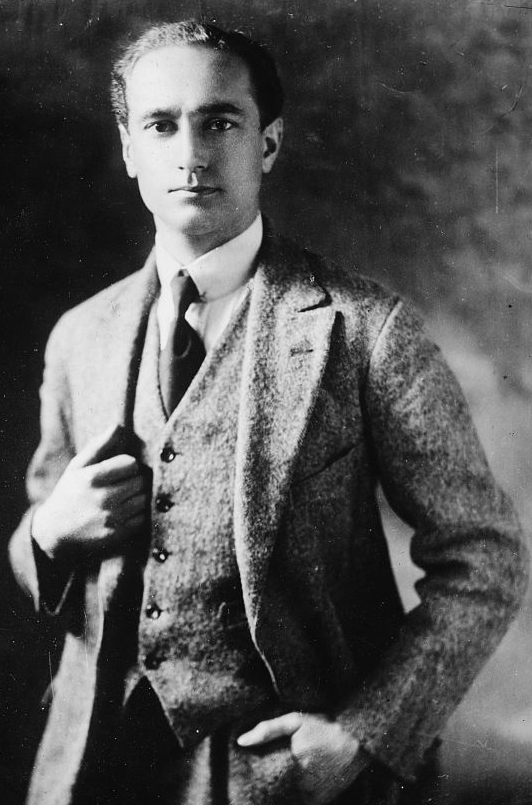
- Dukes, c. 1922
- Born: Paul Henry Dukes; 10 February 1889; Bridgwater, Somerset, England
- Died: 27 August 1967 (aged 78); Cape Town, South Africa
- Other name: The Man with a Hundred Faces
- Education: Caterham School; Petrograd Conservatoire
- Spouses: Margaret Stuyvesant Rutherfurd (m. 1922; div. 1929); Diana Fitzgerald (m. 1959)
- Espionage activity
- Allegiance: United Kingdom; White Movement
- Service branch: Secret Intelligence Service.
- Codename: ST-25
- Operations: Operation Kronstadt

Sir Paul Henry Dukes KBE (10 February 1889 – 27 August 1967) was a British MI6 officer and author.

== Early life and family ==
Paul Henry Dukes was born the third of five children on 10 February 1889 in Bridgwater, Somerset, England. He was the son of the Congregationalist clergyman, Rev. Edwin Joshua Dukes (1847–1930), of Kingsland, London, and his wife, the former Edith Mary Pope (1863–1898), of Sandford, Devon. Edith was an academically gifted woman, the daughter of a schoolteacher, who obtained her Bachelor of Arts degree by correspondence course at the age of 20. In 1884, she married Edwin, who had returned from missionary work in China. She died from a disease of the thyroid gland, and in 1907, Edwin remarried to a 40-year-old widow named Harriet Rouse.

Paul's siblings included the playwright Ashley Dukes (1885–1959) and the renowned physician Cuthbert Dukes (1890–1977). He had an elder sister, Irene Catherine Dukes (1887–1950), who led a life plagued by illness, and yet another, younger brother, Marcus Braden Dukes (1893–1936), who died in Kuala Lumpur while working as a government official. His sister-in-law was the renowned ballet dancer Marie Rambert. Paul Dukes was also the great-uncle of poet Aidan Andrew Dun, who is the grandson of his brother Ashley.

Paul was educated at Caterham School before going on to pursue a career in music at the Petrograd Conservatoire in Russia.

== Career ==
As a young man he took a position as a language teacher in Riga, Livland. He later moved to St. Petersburg, having been recruited personally by Mansfield Smith-Cumming, the first "C" of MI6 (SIS), to act as a secret agent in Imperial Russia, relying on his fluency in the Russian language. At the time, he was employed at the Petrograd Conservatoire as a concert pianist and deputy conductor to Albert Coates. In his new capacity as sole British agent in Russia, he set up elaborate plans to help prominent White Russians escape from the Gulag and smuggled hundreds of them into Finland.

Known as the "Man of a Hundred Faces," Dukes continued his use of disguises, which aided him in assuming a number of identities and gained him access to numerous Bolshevik organizations. He successfully infiltrated the Communist Party of the Soviet Union, the Comintern, and even the political police, or CHEKA. Dukes also learned of the inner workings of the Politburo, and passed the information to British intelligence.

He returned to Britain a distinguished hero, and in 1920 was knighted by King George V, who called Dukes the "greatest of all soldiers." To this day, Dukes is the only person knighted based entirely on his exploits in espionage.

He briefly returned to active service in 1939, helping to locate a prominent Czech businessman who had disappeared after the Nazi occupation of Czechoslovakia. He referred to the businessman as Alfred Obry in his later book about the search, entitled An Epic of the Gestapo. According to A History of the British Secret Service (1969), "Paul Dukes was always a meticulous agent in paying attention to detail. He combed all the Czech papers and in one found this paragraph: 'A thirteen-year-old boy found on the railway line to Tuschkau the completely unrecognizable corpse of a man. The body was mutilated beyond recognition and the right hand was missing. The police pronounced a verdict of suicide. From papers found on the body it appeared the person was Friedrich Sweiger, a tailor of Prague.' Dukes immediately suspected Sweiger was in fact Obry, especially since this was the route Obry was to have taken on his escape. He built up a strong case against the Gestapo of murdering Obry and not only demanded exhumation of the body but succeeded in persuading the Germans to do this. The corpse was undoubtedly that of Obry."

Dukes was also a leading figure in introducing yoga to the Western World.

=== Writing ===
His book Red Dusk and the Morrow chronicles the rise and fall of Bolshevism and he toured the world extensively giving lectures pertaining to this subject. Dukes' other books are listed below.

== Personal life ==
In 1922, Dukes was first married to Margaret Stuyvesant Rutherfurd (1891–1976), former wife of Ogden Livingston Mills, the U.S. Secretary of the Treasury. Margaret was the daughter of Anne Harriman, the second wife of William Kissam Vanderbilt, and her second husband, Lewis Morris Rutherfurd, Jr., son of the astronomer Lewis Morris Rutherfurd. They divorced in 1929, and Dukes later married Diana Fitzgerald in 1959.

He died on 27 August 1967 in Cape Town, South Africa, aged 78.

== Works ==
- (1921). "What Russia Thinks of the Bolsheviki," The World's Work, Vol. XLII, pp. 100–104.
- (1921). "Sovietism's Effect on Russia's Young," The New York Times, 17 July, p. 27.
- (1921). "The Secret Door," The Atlantic Monthly, Vol. CXXVIII, pp. 1–13.
- (1922). Red Dusk and the Morrow: Adventures and Investigations in Red Russia. London: Williams and Norgate.
- (1938). The Story of "ST 25": Adventure and Romance in the Secret Intelligence Service in Red Russia. London: Cassell and Co.
- (1940). An Epic of the Gestapo: The Story of a Strange Search, London: Cassell and Co.
- (1947). Come Hammer, Come Sickle! London: Cassell and Co.
- (1950). The Unending Quest: Autobiographical Sketches. London: Cassell and Co.
- (1958). Yoga for the Western World, Students of Western Yoga.
- (1960). The Yoga of Health, Youth and Joy: A Treatise on Hatha Yoga Adapted to the West. London: Cassell and Co.
