= Harriman family =

American business and political family

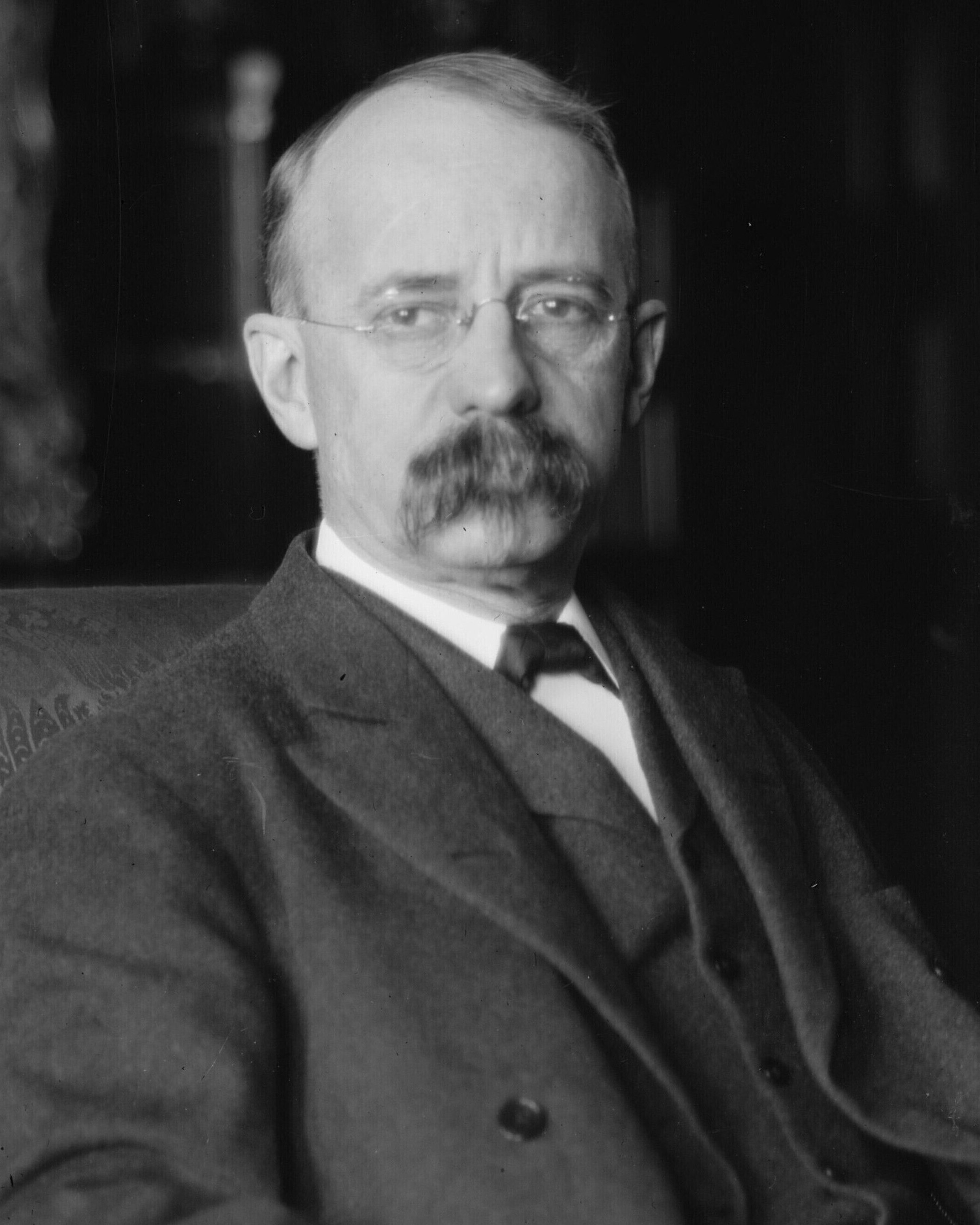
- E.H. Harriman, the patriarch under whom the family rose to nationwide prominence in the United States.
- Current region: New York, U.S.
- Origin: England
- Founder: William Harriman
- Titles: List: United States Secretary of Commerce; United States Ambassador (to France, Norway, the Soviet Union, and the United Kingdom); Governor of New York
- Connected families: Digby family; Gerry family; Mortimer family
- Estate: Arden (estate)

The Harriman family is a wealthy American family based in New York. Its wealth was primarily earned by E.H. Harriman, a powerful railroad tycoon whose empire encompassed 25,000 miles of railway nationwide. At its height, this network included the Illinois Central, Southern Pacific and Union Pacific railroads among others. The family would go on to invest its fortune in banking, shipping, airlines, and Thoroughbred racing.

== History ==
The family's business prominence was established by E. H. Harriman, who became one of the leading American railroad organizers of the late nineteenth and early twentieth centuries. His railroad interests included the Illinois Central Railroad, Union Pacific Railroad, and Southern Pacific Railroad.

E. H. Harriman's sons W. Averell Harriman and E. Roland Harriman would become prominent figures in both banking and finance. Averell Harriman founded W. A. Harriman & Co., which later became Harriman Brothers & Company after Roland joined the firm. In 1931, Harriman Brothers & Company merged with Brown Brothers & Co. to form Brown Brothers Harriman & Co.

The family was also associated with the estate of Arden in Harriman, New York. E. H. Harriman acquired the property in the 1880s, and the estate later became associated with the family's philanthropic and public activities.

== List of members ==
- William Harriman, emigrated from England to the United States in 1795
  - Orlando Harriman (1790-1867) m. Anna Ingland (1791-1853)
    - Rev. Orlando Harriman Sr. (1813–1881) m. 1842 Cornelia Neilson (1814–1889)
      - John Neilson Harriman (1843-1898) m. Elizabeth Grainger Hancox
        - Joseph Wright Harriman (1867-1949) m. Augusta Barney
          - Miriam Harriman (1894-1947) m. Geb. Boykin Cabell Wright (1891-1956)
          - Alan Harriman (1899-1928)
      - Orlando Harriman Jr. (1844-1911)
      - Annie Ingland Harriman (1846-1920)
      - Edward Henry Harriman (1848–1909) m. 1879 Mary Williamson Averell (1851–1931)
        - Mary Harriman (1881–1934) m. 1910 Charles Cary Rumsey (1879–1922)
        - Henry Neilson Harriman (born 1883)
        - Cornelia Averell Harriman (1884–1966) m. 1908 Robert Livingston Gerry, Sr. (1877–1957)
          - Elbridge T. Gerry Sr.
          - Robert L. Gerry Jr.
          - Edward Harriman Gerry
          - Henry Averell Gerry
        - Carol Harriman (born 1889)
        - William Averell Harriman (1891–1986) 1st m. 1915 Kitty Lanier Lawrance (1893-1936), (divorced 1929); 2nd m. 1930 Marie Norton (1903–1970); 3rd m. 1971 The Hon. Pamela Beryl Digby (1920–1997)
          - Mary Williamson Harriman (1917-1996) m. 1940 Dr. Shirley Carter Fisk
          - Kathleen Lanier Harriman (1917–2011) m. 1947 Stanley Grafton Mortimer Jr. (1913-1999)
        - Edward Roland Harriman (1895–1978) m. 1917 Gladys Fries (1896–1983)
          - Elizabeth Harriman 1st m. Alexander C. Northrop; 2nd m. Maximillian Bliss Jr.
          - Phyllis Harriman m. Frank Herbert Mason (1921–2009)
      - Cornelia Neilson Harriman (1850-1926) m. Charles Dewar Simons (1847-1926)
      - William MacCurdy Harriman (1854-1903)
    - Oliver Harriman (1829–1904) m. Laura Low (1839-1901)
      - James Low Harriman m. Elizabeth Templeton Bishop (1865-1934)
        - Oliver Bishop Harriman (died 1926)
        - Mary Bishop Harriman 1st m. Felix Tower Rosen; 2nd m. Pierre Lecomte du Noüy (1883-1947)
      - Emmeline Harriman (1860-1938) 1st m. William Earl Dodge III. (1858-1884); 2nd m. Stephen H. Olin; 3rd m. Howland Spencer
      - Anne Harriman (1861-1940) 1st m. Samuel Stevens Sands Jr. (1856-1889); 2nd m. Lewis Morris Rutherfurd Jr. (1859-1901); 3rd m. 1903 William Kissam Vanderbilt (1849-1920)
      - Oliver Harriman Jr. (1862-1940) m. 1891 Grace Carley
        - Oliver Carley Harriman
        - John Harriman
        - Borden Harriman
      - Jefferson Borden Harriman (1864-1914) m. 1889 Florence Jaffray Hurst (1870-1967)
        - Ethel M. B. Harriman (1897-1953) m. Henry Potter Russell (born 1893)
      - Joseph Harriman
      - Herbert Melville Harriman (1873-1933) 1st m. 1894 Isabella Hunnewell (1871-1968), (divorced 1906); 2nd m. 1908 Mary Madeline Brady (1866-1930), (divorced 1921); 3rd m. 1921 Sarah Jane Hunter (1891-1933)
      - Lillie Harriman 1st m. William Riggin Travers Jr.; 2nd m. Frederick Christian Havemeyer

== Businesses ==
The following is a list of businesses in which the Harriman family have held a controlling or otherwise significant financial interest.

- Avco
- Aviation Corporation of the Americas
- Brown Brothers Harriman
- Central of Georgia Railway
- Dresser Industries
- Harriman National Bank
- Illinois Central Railroad
- Log Cabin Stable
- Low, Harriman & Co.
- Merchant Shipbuilding Corporation
- Pacific Mail Steamship Company
- Polaroid Corporation
- Silesian-American Corporation
- Southern Pacific Railroad
- St. Joseph and Grand Island Railway
- Union Banking Corporation
- Union Pacific Railroad
- United American Lines
- Wells Fargo (1852–1998)
