= Grace Carley Harriman =

American philanthropist

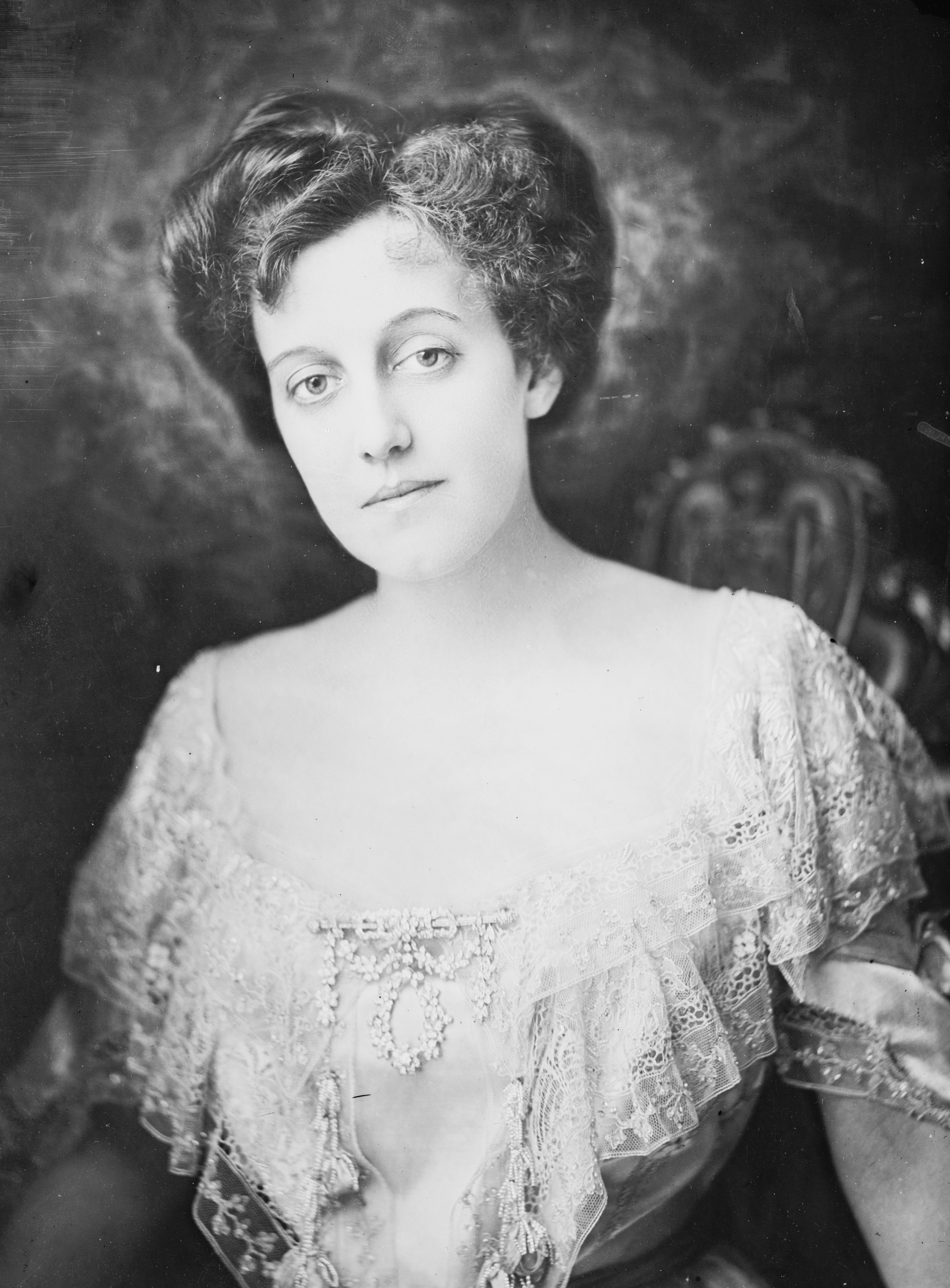
Harriman, c. 1909

Grace Carley Harriman (1873–1950) was an American social leader and philanthropist. Widely known as Mrs. Oliver Harriman, she was a member of the wealthy Harriman family, the wife of investment banker Oliver Harriman Jr. A native of Louisville, Kentucky, she was a co-founder and president of the National Conference on Legalizing Lotteries, a president of the Camp Fire Girls, and a member of the Southern Women's Democratic Club. During World War I she established a food research and conservation laboratory. She was a writer on social topics and author of the 1942 etiquette book Mrs. Oliver Harriman's Book of Etiquette: A Modern Guide to the Best Social Form.
