= Renee Prahar =

Actor

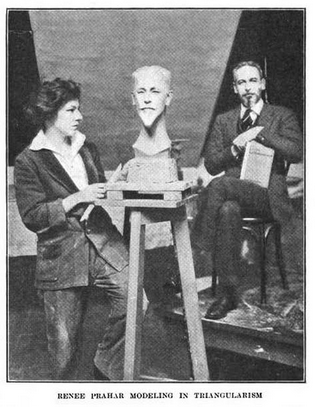
Renee Prahar working, from a 1917 publication.

Renée Prahar (c. 1879 — August 17, 1962) also known as Irene Prahar, was an American sculptor and actress based in New York City and later in Connecticut.

== Early life ==
Irene Prahar was born in New York, of Bohemian ancestry. She studied sculpture in Paris at the École nationale supérieure des Beaux-Arts, working with Auguste Rodin and Antoine Bourdelle. While in Paris, she showed work at the Salon of the Société National des Beaux-Arts in 1911 and again in 1914.

== Career ==
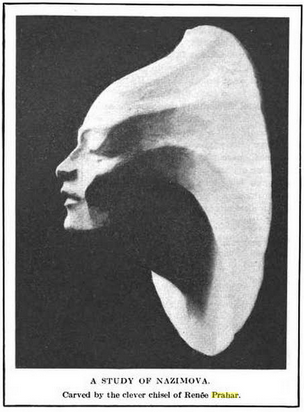
A Study of Alla Nazimova by Renee Prahar, from a 1922 publication.

Prahar began working as a stage actress, in the company of actor Richard Mansfield. She appeared with Mansfield in Old Heidelberg (1903-1904), The Death of Ivan the Terrible (1905), The Merchant of Venice (1906), The Scarlet Letter (1906), and Peer Gynt (1906).

As a sculptor, Prahar created portrait busts and human or animal figures, usually angular and stylized, in a method she called "Triangularism". In 1922, she was hired to create monkey sculptures and architectural features to adorn the terrace of Mrs. W. K. Vanderbilt. Her "Fox Gate Posts" were featured in the 1931 opening of the American Women's Association's permanent gallery in 1931. She also designed a medal for the American Women's Association, given as an award to distinguished women of the New York area. The medal's first recipient in 1931 was Margaret Sanger.

Critic Henry McBride called Prahar "a pioneer in the fantastic and the grotesque." In the same year, the New York Times critic commented on Prahar's "remarkably cool intellectuality".

In 1930 she wrote in protest of fellow sculptor George Grey Barnard's eviction from his studio space. Later in her career, she designed and decorated homes in Connecticut, with George's daughter, Colette Barnard.

== Personal life ==
Renee Prahar died in 1962, aged 83 years, in New London, Connecticut.

A small collection of Prahar's papers are in the Smithsonian's Archives of American Art.
