= Herbert M. Harriman =

- Born: Herbert Melville Harriman; September 28, 1873; New York City, U.S.
- Died: January 3, 1933 (aged 59); Bovagh House, Aghadowey, County Londonderry, Northern Ireland
- Education: Princeton University
- Occupations: Businessman, sportsman
- Spouses: Isabella Hunnewell, Mary Madeline "May" (Brady) Stevens Hall, Sarah J. "Sally" Hunter,
- Parent(s): Oliver Harriman; Laura Low
- Relatives: Anne Harriman Vanderbilt (sister); Oliver Harriman, Jr. (brother); J. Borden Harriman (brother); E. H. Harriman (cousin)

Herbert Melville Harriman (September 28, 1873 – January 3, 1933) was an American businessman, sportsman and heir of the wealthy Harriman family.

== Early life ==
Harriman was born on September 28, 1873, in New York City. His father, Oliver Harriman, was a dry goods merchant. His mother was Laura Low.

Harriman graduated from Princeton University. He served in the American Expeditionary Forces of the United States Army during World War I.

== Career ==
Harriman started his career as a clerk in Omaha, Nebraska, for Union Pacific Railroad. Even though his family were majority shareholders, Harriman wanted to start at the bottom and work his way up. However, he quit after a few months and moved back to New York.

Harriman became a socialite on the East Coast. He was a stockholder of the Newport Casino. Additionally, he was a member of the Newport Reading Room, He was also a member of the Meadow Brook Golf Club, The Brook, the Turf and Field Club and the Piping Rock Club.

== Personal life ==
Harriman married three times. He married his first wife, Isabella Pratt Hunnewell, of a prominent Boston family, on September 26, 1894, at the Hunnewell home in Wellesley, Massachusetts. (Note: Isabella Hunnewell was of a wealthy Boston family, the daughter of Arthur Hunnewell and his wife Jane “Jennie” Hubbard Boit. She was born on May 7, 1871, and died age 97 on December 14, 1868. She married three times. Her first husband was Herbert Melville Harriman (1873-1933). They married on September 26, 1894 in Wellesley, Massachusetts and divorced 12 years later in 1906. Her second husband was sportsman J. (James) Searle Barclay (1875-1945). They married on October 8, 1907 and divorced in 1927. Mr. Barclay married actress Nita Naldi in 1929, who had been named as co-respondent in his divorce. After the divorce, Isabella opened an antique store in New York City at 16 East 56th Street. Isabella’s third husband was businessman Gordon Dexter (1864-1937), whom she married on January 10, 1930. They divorced in 1906.) They lived in New York. They divorced, and she remarried in 1907. His second wife was Mary Madeline “May” Brady. They married in August 1908 at Newport, Rhode Island, and divorced in 1921. (Note: May Brady was born August 2, 1866 and died age 64 on December 30, 1930 in Paris, France. She was the daughter of Judge John Riker Brady (1822-1891) and his wife Katharine Lydig. Her first husband was Charles Albert Stevens (1865-1901), son of Edwin Augustus Stevens. They married on November 15, 1888, and he died in 1901 leaving her a large fortune. She married her second husband, Maj.Charles Spencer Hall of the Oxfordshire Light Infantry, in 1902 at London. She left him to visit her father in America in 1904, and obtained a divorce from Hall in Newport, Rhode Island on December 8, 1907, on the grounds of non-support. She married Herbert Harriman on August 19, 1908 in Newport. Thereupon, Major Hall brought suit for divorce in England, and obtained his divorce there, on the grounds of bigamy, about a year and a half after his wife had remarried. The British judge found that the American divorce decree was invalid. Herbert Melville Harriman and May Brady divorced in 1921.) His third and final wife was Sarah Jane Hunter. They married on October 26, 1921, in Paoli, Indiana. (Note: Sarah Jane Hunter was born December 20, 1891 in Belfast, and died December 29, 1933 in Londonderry, Northern Ireland. She was a Red Cross nurse, and their relationship began when she cared for Harriman when he was an officer in the A. E. F.)

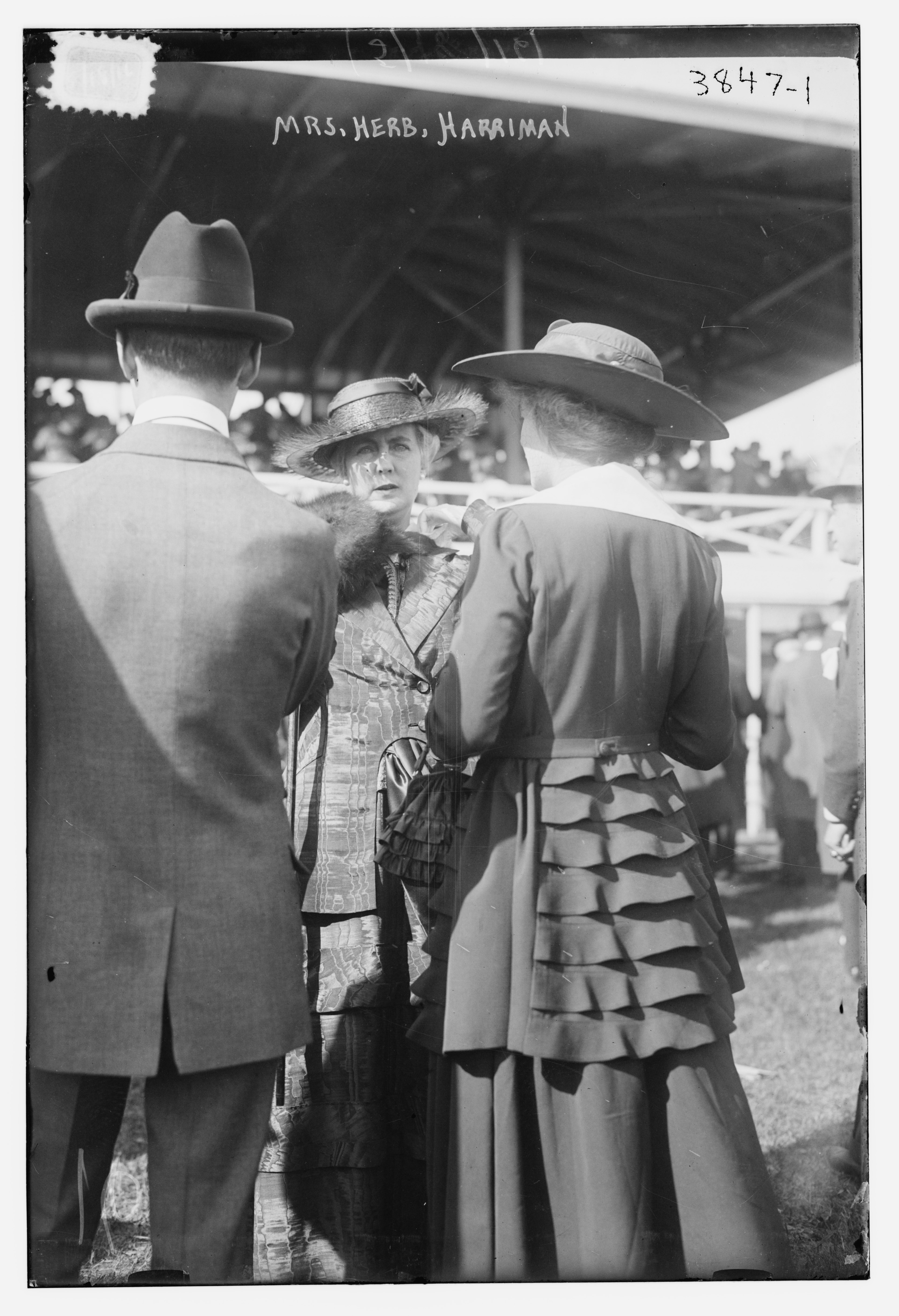
May Brady Harriman in 1915/1916

Harriman was an avid golf and tennis player. In golf, he won both the U.S. Amateur and the Metropolitan Amateur in 1899.

== Death ==
Harriman died on January 3, 1933, in Aghadowey, County Londonderry, Northern Ireland. His estate, which was less than $5,000, was inherited by his widow.
