= Oliver Harriman Jr. =

American stockbroker and heir (1862–1940)

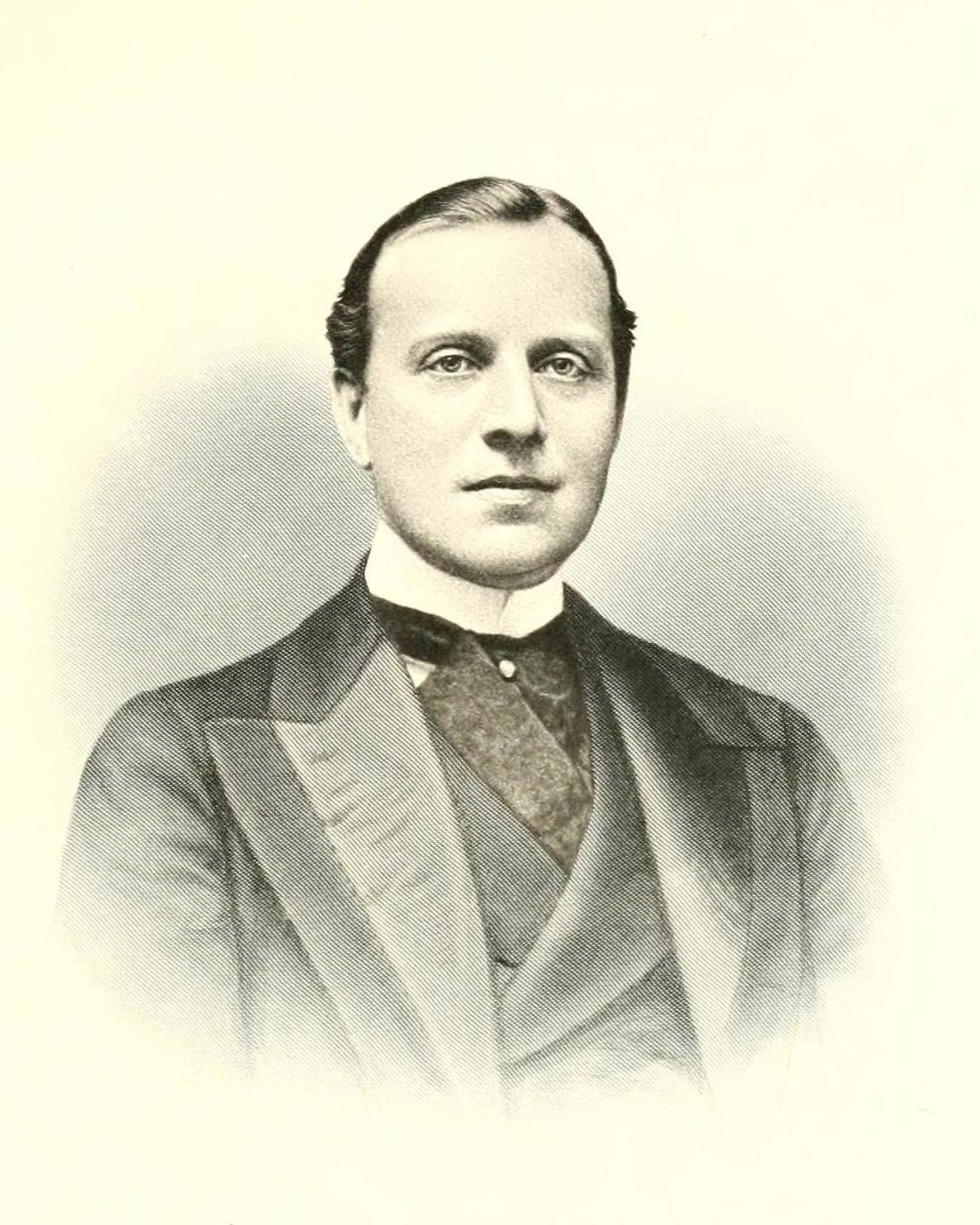
- Born: November 29, 1862; New York City, U.S.
- Died: August 14, 1940 (aged 77); Silver Spring, Maryland, U.S.
- Education: Princeton University
- Occupation: Stockbroker
- Spouse: Grace Carley (m. 1891)
- Children: Oliver Carley Harriman, John Harriman, Borden Harriman
- Parent(s): Oliver Harriman; Laura Low
- Relatives: Anne Harriman Vanderbilt (sister); J. Borden Harriman (brother); Herbert M. Harriman (brother); E. H. Harriman (cousin)

Oliver Harriman Jr. (November 29, 1862 – August 14, 1940) was an American stockbroker and heir of the wealthy Harriman family.

== Early life ==
Oliver Harriman Jr. was born on November 29, 1862, in New York City. His father, Oliver Harriman, was a dry goods businessman. His mother was Laura Low. He had four brothers and three sisters.

Harriman attended Princeton University, where he was a member of the Ivy Club, and graduated in 1883.

== Career ==
Harriman started his career at Winslow, Lanier & Co., an investment firm in New York City, where he worked from 1883 to 1888. He became a partner in Harriman & Co. in 1888.

Harriman served on the board of directors of the Continental Trust Company of New York.

Harriman served in the National Guard of New York from 1888 onward. He was a member of the University Club of New York, the Metropolitan Club, the Knickerbocker Club, the New York Yacht Club, and the Westchester Country Club.

His wife became a philanthropist, serving as president of the National Conference on Legalizing Lotteries and the Camp Fire Girls. Additionally, she joined the Southern Women's Democratic Club. Her miniature portrait was done by Meave Thompson Gedney c. 1900 for art collector Peter Marié.

== Personal life ==
Harriman married Grace Carley of Louisville, Kentucky, on January 28, 1891. They resided at 70 Park Avenue on the island of Manhattan in New York City, and they summered in White Plains, New York. They also owned a residence in Silver Spring, Maryland. Together, Grace and Oliver were the parents of three sons, including:

- Oliver Carley Harriman (1894–1971), a banker with Tucker, Anthony & Co.
- Borden Harriman (1903–1940), who leapt to his death at the Philadelphia YMCA, several weeks after his father's death.
- John Harriman (1904–1961), a financial writer for The Boston Globe.

Harriman died on August 14, 1940, in Silver Spring, Maryland. His funeral was held in White Plains, New York, where he was buried. His widow died a decade later, on March 28, 1950.
