= J. Borden Harriman =

New York financier (1864–1914)

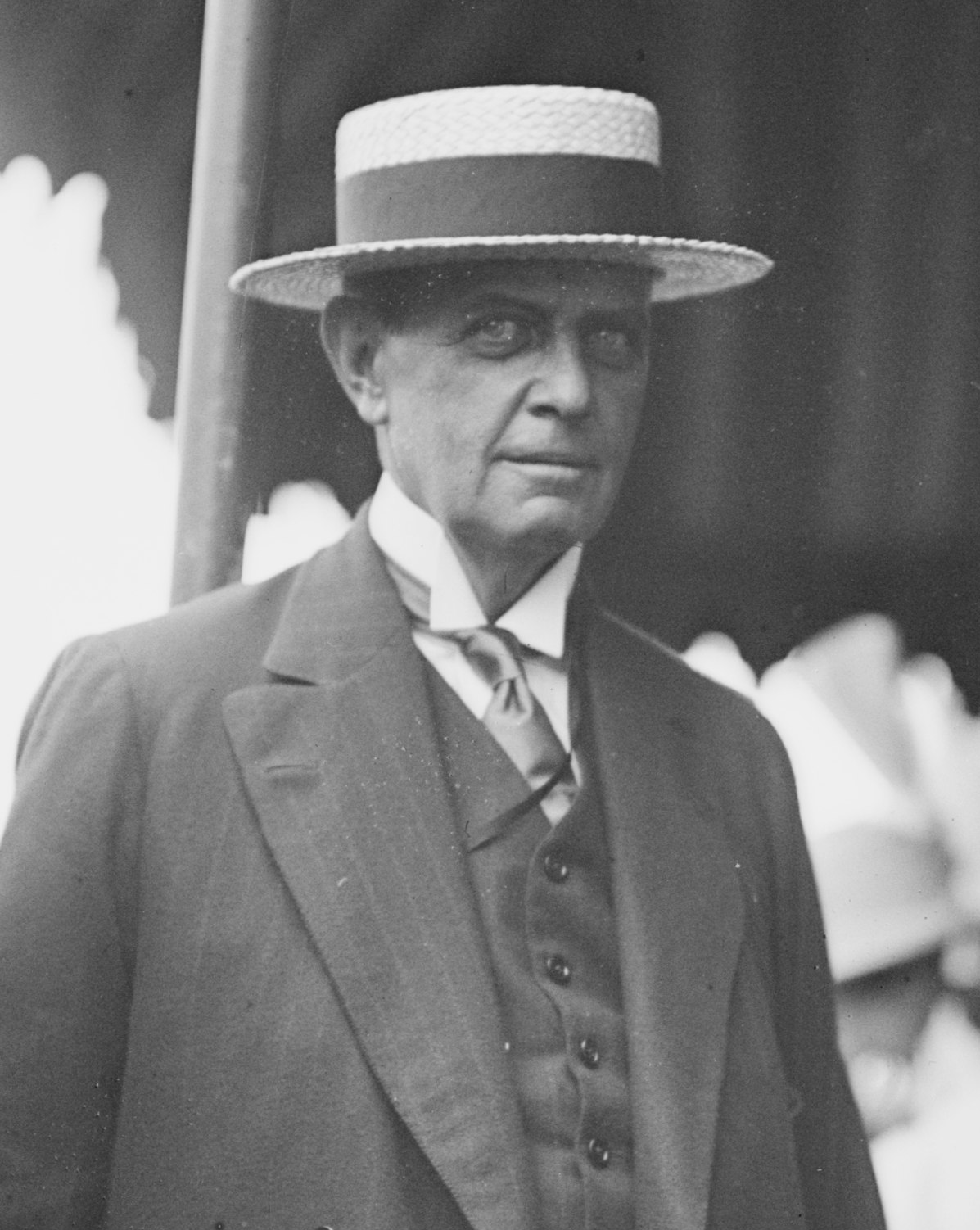
- Harriman in 1910
- Born: September 20, 1864; New York, New York, U.S.
- Died: December 2, 1914 (aged 50); Washington, D.C., U.S.
- Education: Princeton University
- Spouse: Florence Jaffray Hurst (m. 1889)
- Children: Ethel Harriman
- Parent(s): Oliver Harriman; Laura Low
- Relatives: Anne Harriman Vanderbilt (sister); Oliver Harriman Jr. (brother); Herbert M. Harriman (brother); E. H. Harriman (cousin)

Jefferson Borden Harriman (September 20, 1864 – December 2, 1914) was a New York financier who belonged to the Gilded Age's "hunting set" and a member of the wealthy Harriman family. He was best known as the supportive husband of Florence Jaffray Harriman, a socialite who became a progressive social activist and (after his death) a United States Ambassador to Norway during the administration of President Franklin D. Roosevelt. He was a cousin of railroad tycoon Edward Harriman, who was the father of statesman and diplomat W. Averell Harriman. A lingering gastrointestinal problem led to his early retirement and death.

== Early life ==
J. Borden Harriman was born on September 20, 1864. His father, Oliver Harriman, was a partner of a dry goods commission house, which evolved into Low, Harriman & Co. (and then Harriman & Co.), an investment banking firm located on Worth Street, and later 111 Broadway, in Manhattan. Laura was the daughter of James Low, Oliver's business partner. He had seven siblings. In addition to brothers James, Oliver Jr., Joseph, and Herbert, J. Borden had three oft-married sisters—Emeline Harriman Dodge Olin, Anna Harriman Sands Rutherfurd Vanderbilt, and Lillie Harriman Travers Havemeyer.

In 1901, his mother died. Later that year, he and his siblings successfully petitioned a New York court to declare their 70-year-old father incapable to manage his affairs due to senile dementia. At the time, his father's wealth was estimated at over $5 million. His father died the following year.

Harriman graduated from Princeton University in 1885.

== Career ==
Harriman joined his father's business, becoming an investment banker. In 1903, he bid for a seat on the New York Stock Exchange's governing committee, but was thwarted by an outside candidate, even though Harriman had received the committee's nomination, and all other regular nominees prevailed.

He and several brothers and cousins were founding directors or officers in the Day and Night Bank, established in 1906 as the world's first 24-hour bank. Once open, the owners added further innovations—a separate branch reserved for women customers, and an automobile "safe on wheels" that would pick up cash and valuables from depositors' homes. In 1910, after four years of 24-hour operations, it began to restrict its weekday hours, closing from midnight to 8 am.

Harriman left the bank's board of directors in January 1911, when the Day and Night Bank developed an intimate relationship with Merchants' National Bank of New York but changed its name to the Harriman National Bank (reflecting the continued influence of other members of the Harriman family in the bank's ownership and management). Twenty-two years later, after the bank failed in the financial crisis of 1932–1933, its longtime president Joseph Wright Harriman, formerly of Harriman & Co., was convicted by a federal jury of misappropriating bank funds, and served 25 months in prison.

=== U.S. Commission on Industrial Relations ===
Harriman retired the next month, at age 48, from Harriman & Co. Later that year, newly elected President Woodrow Wilson appointed Mrs. Harriman as a member of the first U.S. Commission on Industrial Relations. After President Wilson's appointment, the couple moved to Washington D.C., keeping a residence in New York City while donating their Mount Kisco, New York estate for use as a tuberculosis sanitorium. In early 1914, he lent his yacht, the SS Mohican, to German prince Wilhelm Friedrich Heinrich, who had been chosen by other European monarchs to rule as William, Prince of Albania.

Harriman, his wife and daughter found themselves in the middle of Europe as World War I erupted in the summer of 1914. Hoping that the healing waters in the Bohemian spa in Karlsbad would benefit his health, the family traveled to Europe in June 1914. After meeting with leading British and French officials while relations between the European powers deteriorated, they traveled through France to Karlsbad (then a part of Austria-Hungary), and were there when Austria-Hungary attacked Serbia in late July. After leaving Karlsbad on the last train crossing the frontier through Germany to France, they eventually returned, without their belongings, to New York on an armed British vessel, the RMS Adriatic.

== Personal life ==
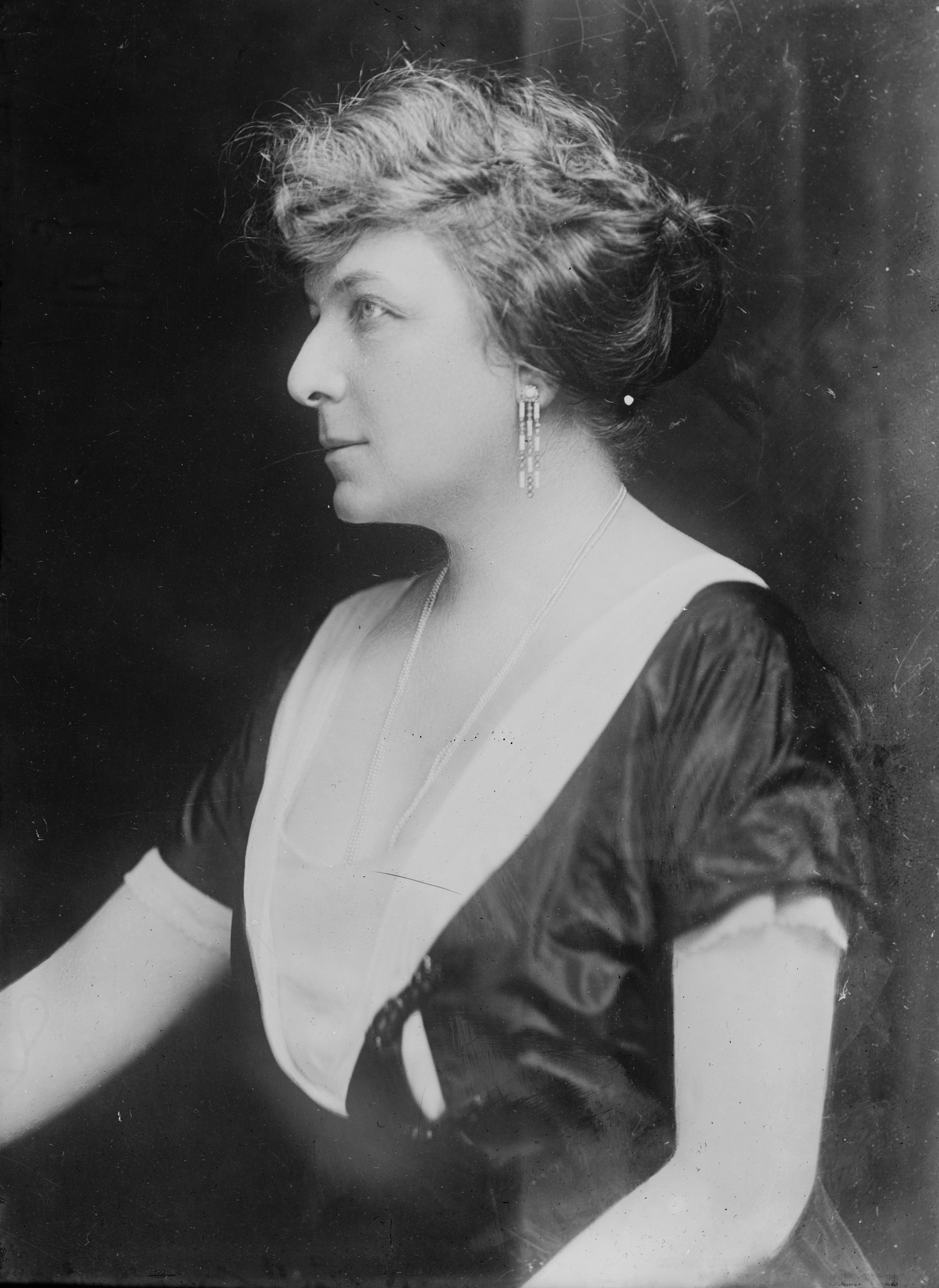
Harriman's wife, Florence Jaffray Harriman, was a suffragist, social reformer, and diplomat.

On November 13, 1889, he married nineteen-year-old Florence Jaffray Hurst, daughter of shipping executive (and former Civil War Union blockade runner) F.W.J. Hurst. The list of attendees at their wedding included past and future president Grover Cleveland, railroad tycoons Cornelius Vanderbilt and Edward Harriman, John Jacob Astor IV, and J. P. Morgan. Together, they had one child:

- Ethel M. Borden Harriman (1897–1953), who worked on Broadway and in Hollywood, as an actress and writer (as Ethel Russell or Ethel Borden).

Harriman became seriously ill in January 1913 with what newspapers described as a lingering "digestive troubles." His health continued to deteriorate, and he died in Washington on December 1, 1914. His prolonged illness, the resulting lack of income, and the expense of maintaining several homes had reportedly consumed nearly all of his net worth. His widow immediately resumed her public and political service, which continued for several decades. She survived her husband by over fifty years (living 97 years until her death in 1967), but never remarried.
