= Oliver Harriman =

American businessman

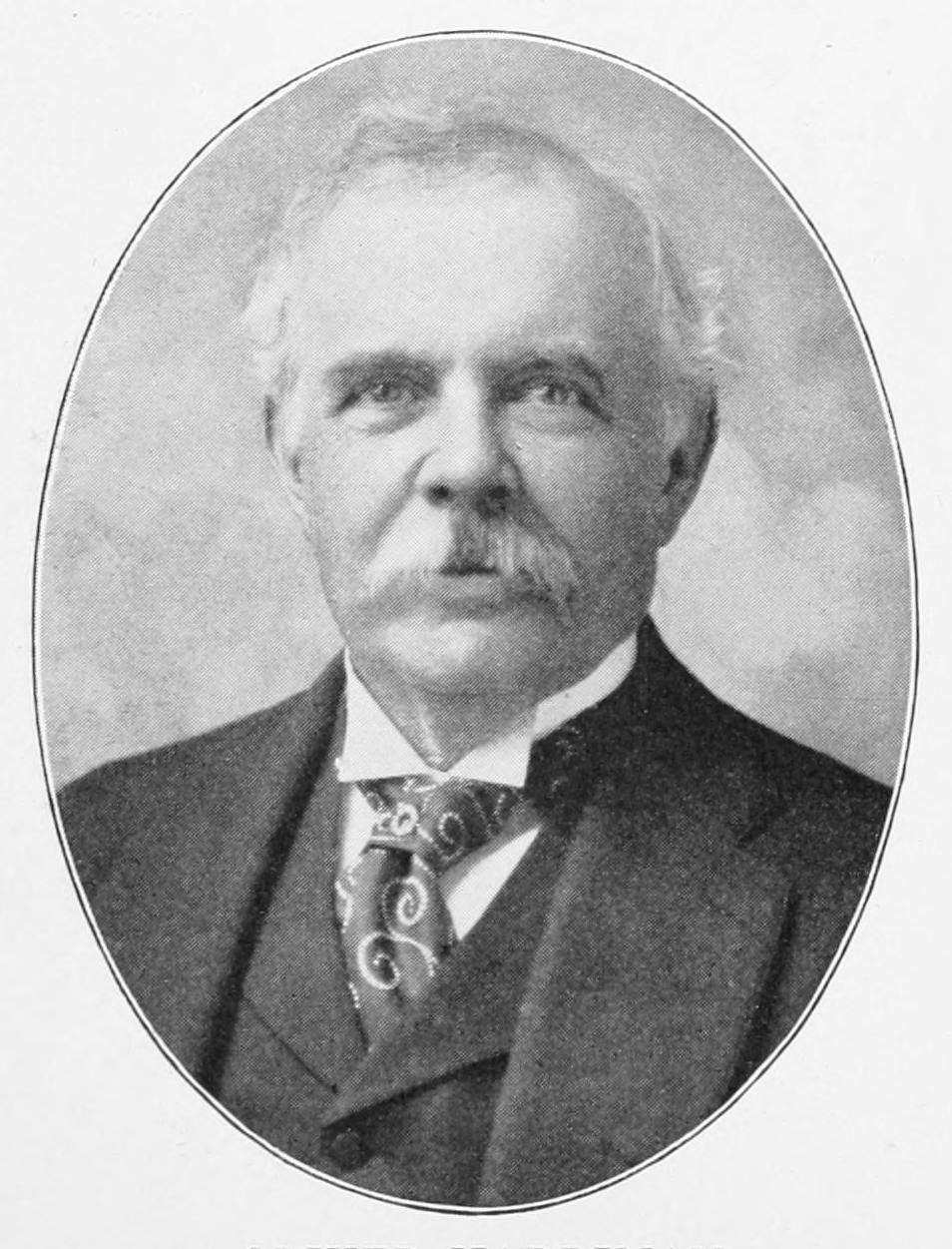
- Born: September 16, 1829; New York City, U.S.
- Died: March 12, 1904 (aged 74); Mount Kisco, New York, U.S.
- Occupation: Businessman
- Spouse: Laura Low
- Children: 8, including Anne, Oliver, Jr., J. Borden, and Herbert
- Relatives: E. H. Harriman (nephew), W. Averell Harriman (grandnephew)

Oliver Harriman (September 16, 1829 – March 12, 1904) was an American businessman and one of the founders of the Harriman business dynasty.

== Early life ==
Oliver Harriman was born on September 16, 1829, in New York City. His parents were Orlando Harriman and Anne Ingland. His brother, Orlando Harriman, was the father of railroad tycoon Edward H. Harriman and grandfather of New York Governor W. Averell Harriman.

His grandfather, William Harriman, emigrated from England in 1795 and engaged successfully in trading and commercial pursuits.

== Career ==
Harriman began his career in the dry goods commission house of McCurdy, Aldrich & Spencer. Later, with James Low, his father-in-law, Harriman co-founded Low, Harriman & Co., "one of the best known and wealthiest" dry goods firms in New York City.

Harriman served on the Boards of Directors of the Bank of America, the Guaranty Trust Company of New York (which later merged with J.P. Morgan & Co.), and the Mutual Life Insurance Company of New York (later known as Mutual of New York).

== Personal life ==
Harriman married Laura Low, the daughter of James Low, the founder of Low, Harriman & Co. They had five sons and three daughters who were prominent in New York and Westchester society:

- James Low Harriman (1856–1928), who married Elizabeth Templeton Bishop, daughter of Heber R. Bishop
- Emmeline Harriman (1860–1938), who married, successively, William Earl Dodge III, Stephen H. Olin, and Howland Spencer.
- Anne Harriman (1861–1940), who married, successively, Samuel Stevens Sands Jr., Lewis Morris Rutherfurd Jr., and William Kissam Vanderbilt
- Oliver Harriman, Jr. (1862–1940), who married Grace Carley in 1891.
- Jefferson Borden Harriman (1864–1914), who married Florence Jaffray Hurst in 1889.
- Joseph Harriman (c. 1865–1925), who married Eugenia "Jean" McLane.
- Herbert Melville Harriman (1873–1933), who was married to Isabella Hunnewell in 1894. They divorced in 1906 and in 1908, he married Mary Madeline Brady. After their divorce in 1921, he married Sarah Jane Hunter in the same year.
- Lillie Harriman (1870-1953), who married William Riggin Travers Jr., son of William R. Travers in 1889, and Frederick Christian Havemeyer IV, son of Theodore Havemeyer in 1906. She filed for divorce from Havemeyer in 1925.

He was the owner of a residence in Riverdale, Bronx.

Harriman died on March 12, 1904, in Mount Kisco, New York. His estate was worth US$20 million. His will stipulated that his wife would inherit their house in Riverdale as well as US$500,000 annually, while his sister, Rosamond H. Owen, would receive US$25,000.

=== Descendants ===
His granddaughter, Mary Bishop Harriman was married to Count Pierre Lecomte du Noüy (1883-1947).
