= E. H. Harriman =

American financier and railroad magnate (1848–1909)

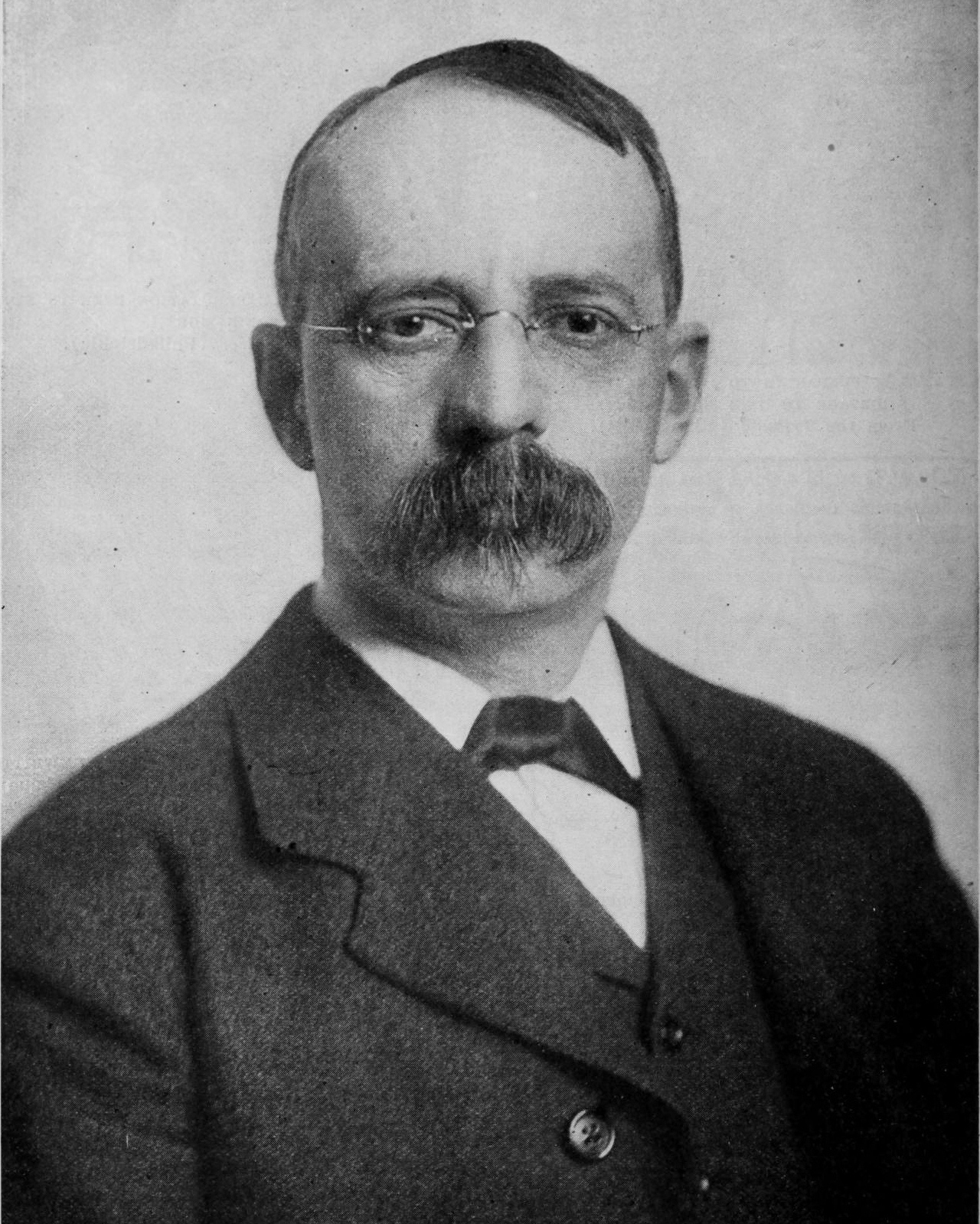
- Born: Edward Henry Harriman; February 20, 1848; Hempstead, New York, U.S.
- Died: September 9, 1909 (aged 61); Orange County, New York, U.S.
- Resting place: St. John's Church Cemetery, Arden, New York
- Occupations: Financier; Railroad tycoon
- Known for: Harriman Alaska expedition
- Spouse: Mary Williamson Averell (m. 1879)
- Children: Mary Harriman Rumsey; Henry Neilson Harriman; Cornelia Harriman Gerry; Carol A. Harriman; William Averell Harriman; Edward Roland Noel Harriman
- Relatives: Anne Harriman Vanderbilt (cousin); Oliver Harriman Jr. (cousin); J. Borden Harriman (cousin); Herbert M. Harriman (cousin)

Edward Henry Harriman (February 20, 1848 – September 9, 1909) was an American financier and railroad executive as well as one of the founders of the Harriman business dynasty.

== Early life ==
Harriman was born on February 20, 1848, in Hempstead, New York, the son of Orlando Harriman Sr., an Episcopal clergyman, and Cornelia Neilson. He had a brother, Orlando Harriman Jr. His great-grandfather, William Harriman, had emigrated from England in 1795 and became a successful businessman and trader.

As a young boy, Harriman spent a summer working at the Greenwood Iron Furnace in the area owned by the Robert Parker Parrott family that would become Harriman State Park. He quit school at age 14 to take a job as an errand boy on Wall Street in New York City. His uncle Oliver Harriman had earlier established a career there. By age 22, he was a member of the New York Stock Exchange.

== Career ==
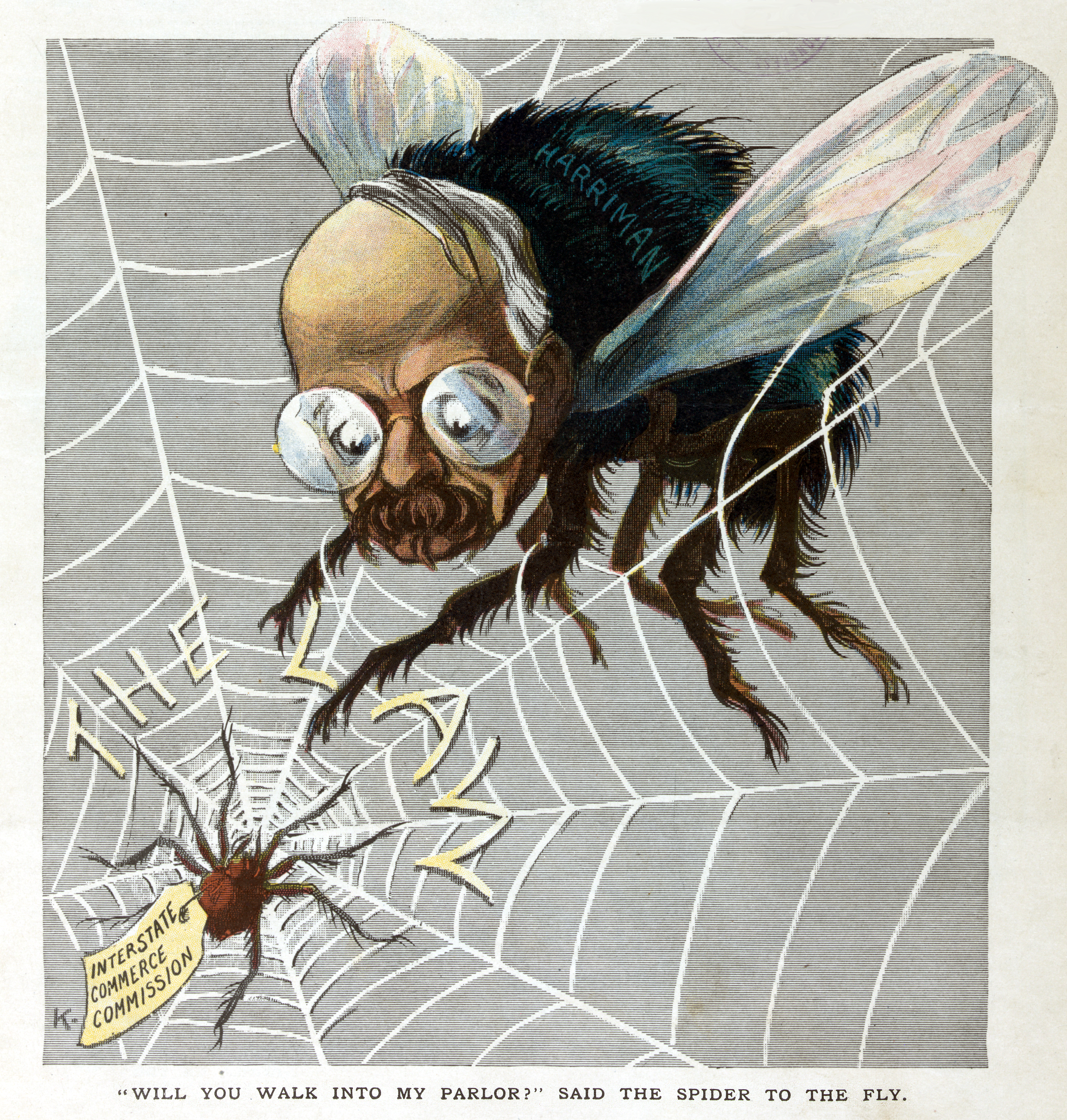
A 1907 cartoon by Udo Keppler depicting Harriman and his railroads as subject to federal law and the Interstate Commerce Commission

Harriman's father-in-law was president of the Ogdensburg and Lake Champlain Railroad Company, which aroused Harriman's interest in upstate New York transportation. In 1881, at age 33, Harriman acquired the small, broken-down Lake Ontario Southern Railroad. He renamed it the Sodus Bay & Southern, reorganized it, and sold it to the Pennsylvania Railroad at a considerable profit. This was the start of his career as a rebuilder of bankrupt railroads.

Harriman was nearly 50 years old when in 1897 he became a director of the Union Pacific Railroad. By May 1898, he was chairman of the executive committee, and from that time until his death, his word was the law on the Union Pacific system. In 1903, he assumed the office of president of the company. From 1901 to 1909, Harriman was also the president of the Southern Pacific Railroad. The vision of a unified UP/SP railroad was planted with Harriman. (The UP and SP were reunited on September 11, 1996, a month after the Surface Transportation Board approved their merger.)

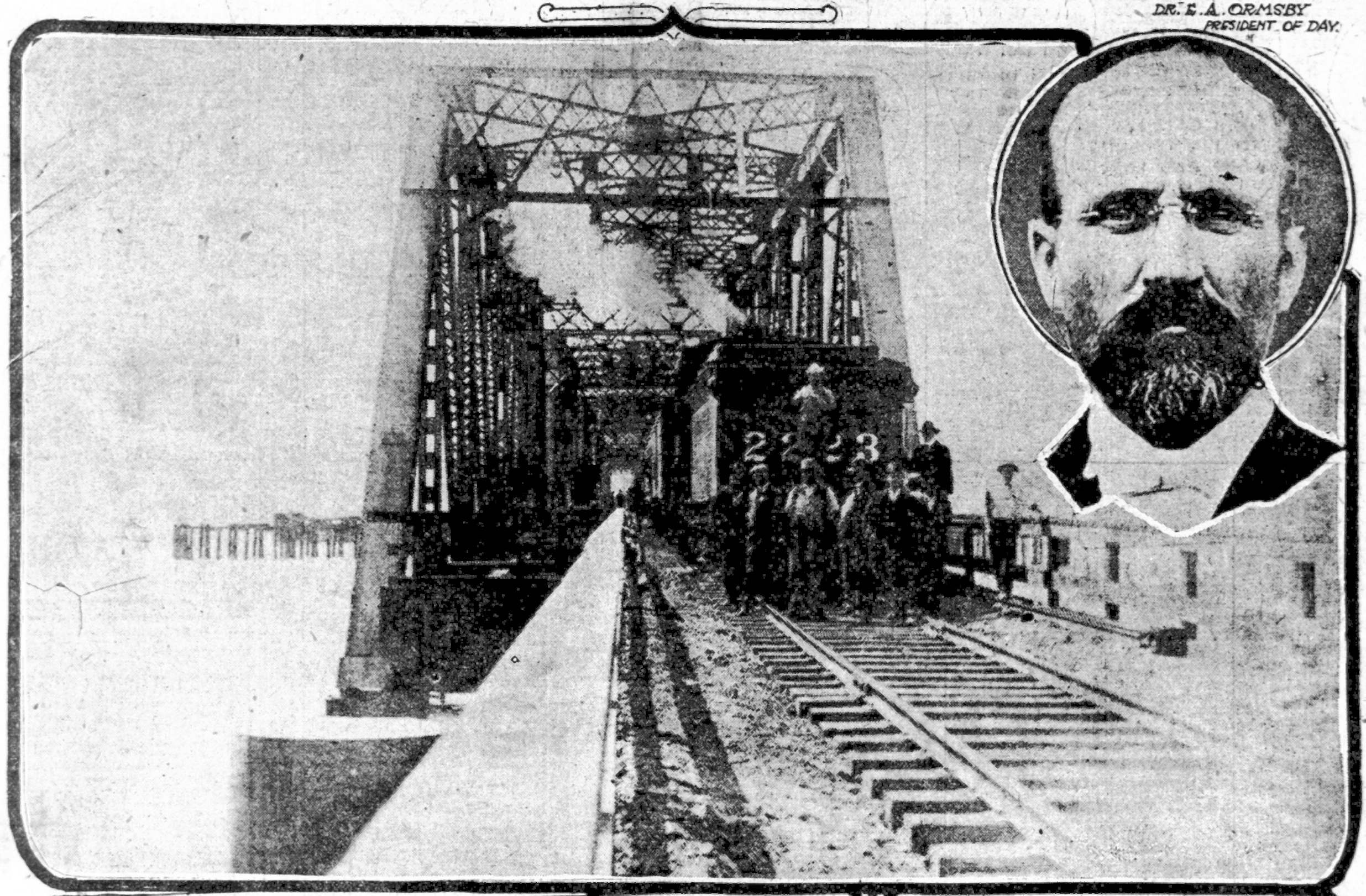
In 1910, the first passenger train crossed the Dumbarton Rail Bridge, a project championed by Harriman.

At the time of his death Harriman controlled the Union Pacific, the Southern Pacific, the Saint Joseph and Grand Island, the Illinois Central, the Central of Georgia, the Pacific Mail Steamship Company, and the Wells Fargo Express Company. Estimates of his estate ranged from $150 million to $200 million. That fortune was left entirely to his wife.

=== Harriman Alaska expedition ===
In 1899, Harriman sponsored and accompanied a scientific expedition to catalog the flora and fauna of the Alaska coastline. Many prominent scientists and naturalists went on the expedition, aboard the luxuriously refitted 250-foot (76 m) steamer SS George W. Elder. During this time, Harriman was living in the northern wing of New York City's Villard Houses.

=== Interest in ju-jitsu ===
Harriman became interested in ju-jitsu after his two-month visit to Japan in 1905. When he returned to America, he brought with him a troupe of six Japanese ju-jitsu wrestlers, including the prominent judokas Tsunejiro Tomita and Mitsuyo Maeda. Among many performances, the troupe gave an exhibition that drew some 600 spectators in the Columbia University gymnasium on February 7, 1905.

== Personal life ==
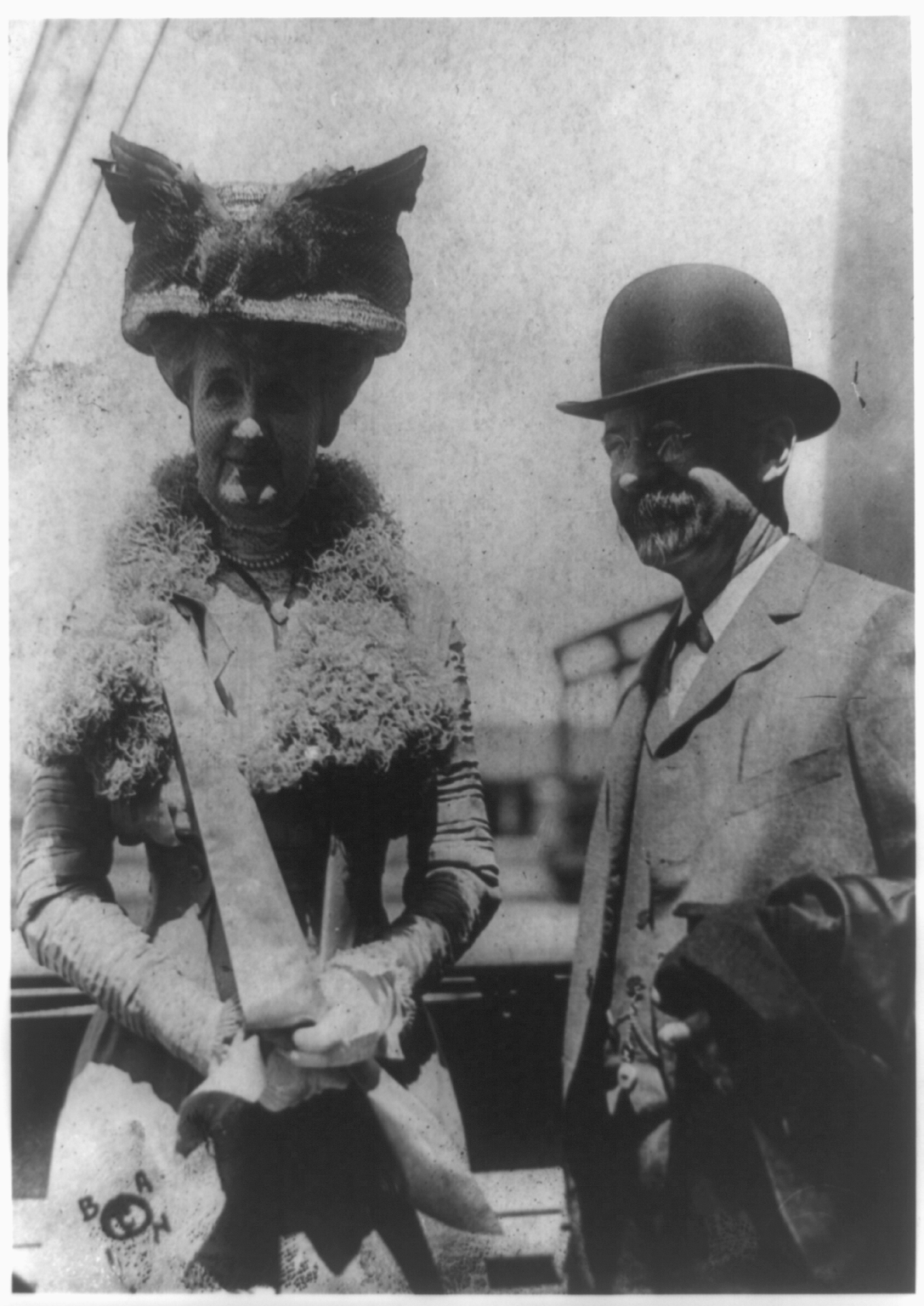
Harriman posing for a photograph alongside his wife, Mary Williamson Averell.

In 1879, Harriman married Mary Williamson Averell, daughter of William J. Averell, a banker in Ogdensburg, New York. Together they had six children:

- Mary Harriman (1881–1934), who married Charles Cary Rumsey (1879–1922), a sculptor, in 1910.
- Henry Neilson Harriman (1883–1888), who died young.
- Cornelia Harriman (1884–1966), who married Robert Livingston Gerry Sr. (1877–1957) in 1908.
- Carol Averell Harriman (1889–1948), who married Richard Penn Smith Jr. (1893–1929) in 1917. After his death, she married W. Plunket Stewart, who had previously been married and divorced from Elsie Cassatt, the daughter of Alexander Cassatt, in 1930.
- William Averell Harriman (1891-1986), the Secretary of Commerce under President Harry S. Truman, the 48th Governor of New York, the U.S. Ambassador to the Soviet Union and U.S. Ambassador to Britain. He was married three times: First to Kitty Lanier Lawrance (from 1915 until their divorce in 1929), then Marie Norton Whitney (from 1930 until her death in 1970), then lastly Pamela Beryl Digby Churchill Hayward (from 1971 until his death in 1986)
- Edward Roland Noel Harriman (1895–1978), who married Gladys Fries (1896–1983) in 1917.

Harriman died on September 9, 1909, at his home, Arden, at 1:30 p.m. at age 61. Naturalist John Muir, who had joined him on the 1899 Alaska expedition, wrote in his eulogy of Harriman, "In almost every way, he was a man to admire."

=== Harriman estate ===
In 1885, Harriman acquired "Arden", the 7,863-acre (31.82 km^{2}) Parrott family estate in the Ramapo Highlands near Tuxedo, New York, for $52,500. The property had been a source of iron ore for the Parrott Brothers Iron Works. Over the next several years he purchased almost 40 nearby parcels of land, adding 20,000 acres (81 km^{2}), and connected all of them with 40 miles (64 km) of bridle paths. His 100,000 sq ft (9,300 m^{2}) residence, Arden House, was completed just seven months before he died.

In the early 1900s, his sons W. Averell Harriman and E. Roland Harriman hired landscape architect Arthur P. Kroll to landscape many acres. In 1910, his widow donated 10,000 acres (40 km^{2}) to the state of New York for Harriman State Park. The estate was designated a National Historic Landmark in 1966.

== Legacy ==
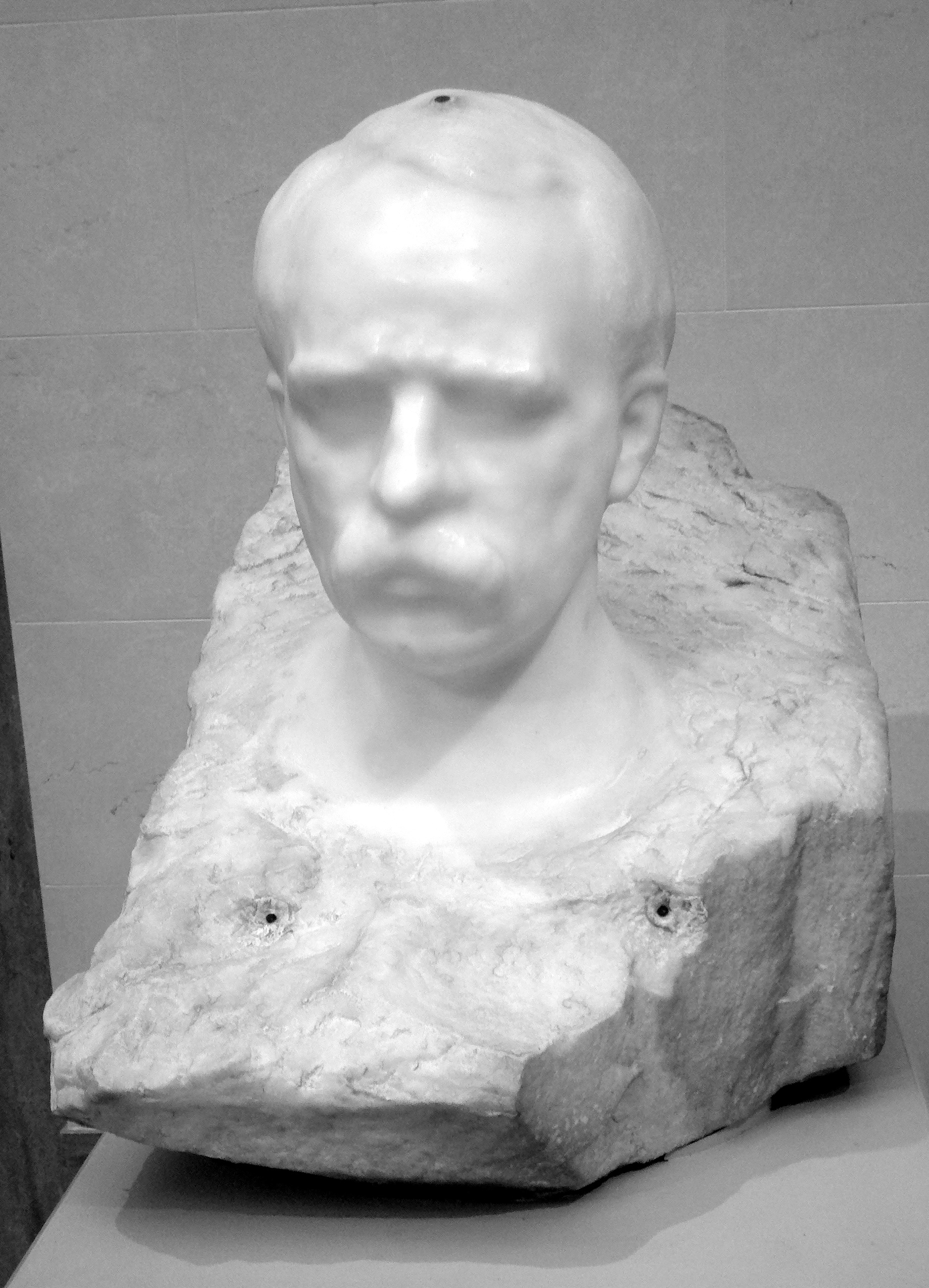
Bust of Edward H. Harriman by Auguste Rodin

=== Award ===
- In 1913, his widow created the E. H. Harriman Award to recognize outstanding achievements in railway safety. The award has been presented on an annual basis since then.
- Stephen Birmingham writes in the book Our Crowd that "Ned" Harriman was considered one of the most disagreeable men of his period. The book quotes James Stillman of the National City Bank calling him "not a safe man to do business with, yet the Illinois Central run by Harriman was one of the best-run and most profitable in the country."

=== Namesakes ===
- Harriman, New York
- The Union Pacific Harriman Dispatch Center in Omaha, Nebraska is named for Edward H. Harriman.
- Harriman Glacier in Alaska's Chugach National Forest, located in Whittier, Alaska, was named for him by the Harriman Alaska expedition
- Two post offices in Oregon were named for Harriman, including the one at Rocky Point, where he maintained a summer camp for several years.
- Financial and business publisher Harriman House is named after Harriman.
- The city of Sparks, Nevada, was known as Harriman during its early existence.
- Harriman State Park in Tuxedo, New York
- Harriman State Park in Island Park, Idaho
- SS E. H. Harriman, a Liberty Ship built in World War II

=== Places built using funds donated from his sponsorship or estate ===
- Harriman founded the Tompkins Square Boys' Club, now known as The Boys' Club of New York. The original club, founded in 1876, was located in the rented basement of the Wilson School in Manhattan's Lower East Side, and began with three boys. Harriman's idea for the club was to provide a place "for the boys, so as to get them off the streets and teach them better manners." By 1901, the club had outgrown its space. Harriman purchased several lots on 10th and Avenue A, and a five-story clubhouse was completed in 1901.
- Inheritance taxes from Harriman's estate, in the amount of $798,546 paid by his widow on March 1, 1911, to the State of Utah, helped fund the construction of the state's capitol building.

== In popular culture ==
- Harriman is the topic of a verse in the song "The Yama Yama Man" (1908) that concerns the war of succession with Stuyvesant Fish over the Illinois Central Railroad around 1906.
- Harriman is mentioned in the movie Butch Cassidy and the Sundance Kid (1969), as the commercial baron whose agents become the title characters' nemeses. In the film's second train robbery, a railroad employee ascribes his refusal to cooperate with the robbery to his obligations to Harriman personally, and one of Butch and Sundance's intimates describes Harriman's hiring of famed outlaw-hunters to track down the gang's leaders.
- In the movie The Wild Bunch (1969), a railroad official named Pat Harrigan serves as a stand-in for Harriman.
- Harriman is a playable character in the video game series Railroad Tycoon.
- Harriman is one of the several prominent industrial figures who serve as inspiration for Leviticus Cornwall in the 2018 video game Red Dead Redemption 2.
- Edward Harriman is one of the Great Merchants in the video game Civilization V.
- Science fiction author Robert A. Heinlein's Future History stories feature a "robber baron" character named D.D. Harriman, a probable reference to E.H. Harriman.

== See also ==
- List of railroad executives
