= Tuxedo, New York =

- Town
- Town of Tuxedo
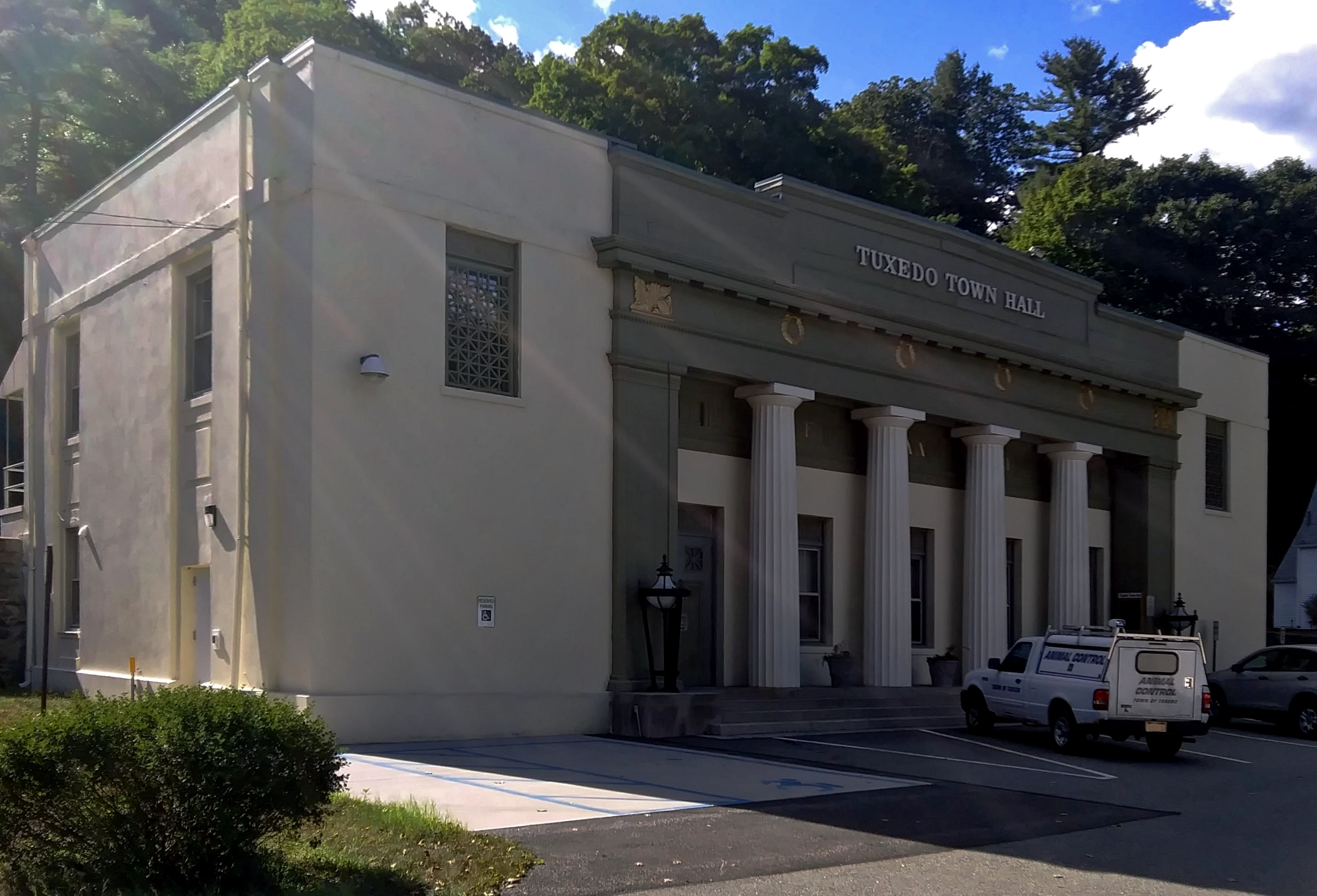
- Town Hall

- Location in Orange County and the state of New York.

- Location within the state of New York
- Coordinates: 41°13′19″N 74°11′8″W
- Country: United States
- State: New York
- County: Orange

Government
  - Supervisor: Kenneth English (D)

Area
  - Total: 49.34 sq mi (127.80 km^{2})
  - Land: 47.05 sq mi (121.85 km^{2})
  - Water: 2.30 sq mi (5.95 km^{2})
- Elevation: 479 ft (146 m)

Population (2020)
  - Total: 3,811
  - Density: 81.0/sq mi (31.28/km^{2})
- Time zone: UTC-5 (EST)
  - Summer (DST): UTC-4 (EDT)
- ZIP code: 10987
- Area codes: 845, 329
- FIPS code: 36-75781
- GNIS feature ID: 0979566
- Website: www.tuxedogov.org

Tuxedo is a town and village in Orange County, New York, United States, along the Ramapo River. As of the 2020 census, the town had a total population of 3,811. The village was incorporated in 2021 and comprises all of the town that is not part of the village of Tuxedo Park. As of the 2020 Census, the village has a population of 3,169. The town is in the southeastern part of the county in the Ramapo Mountains. New York State Route 17 and the New York State Thruway (Interstate 87) pass through the town. The name is derived from a Lenape word tucseto, which has several known meanings.

== History ==
The historic occupants of what is now the town of Tuxedo were the Lenni-Lenape, a branch of the large Algonquian language family of Native Americans, whose different branches lived along the East Coast from Canada through the Upper South. The name Tuxedo is derived from the Lenape word ptukwsiit (Munsee dialect) or tùkwsit (Unami dialect), meaning "round foot" or Wolf Clan, e.g. the Unami name for this location is tùkwsitu, "place of the Wolf-Clan People". European-American colonists adopted that name for the town they developed.

Some Lenape stayed in villages in the Ramapo Mountains, having migrated west from Connecticut. They gradually intermarried with other ethnic groups in what was long a relatively remote frontier. They maintained a culture and community of their own in this area on both sides of the later border with New Jersey. The Ramapough Mountain Indians have been recognized by New Jersey as a Native American tribe.

=== 1700s ===
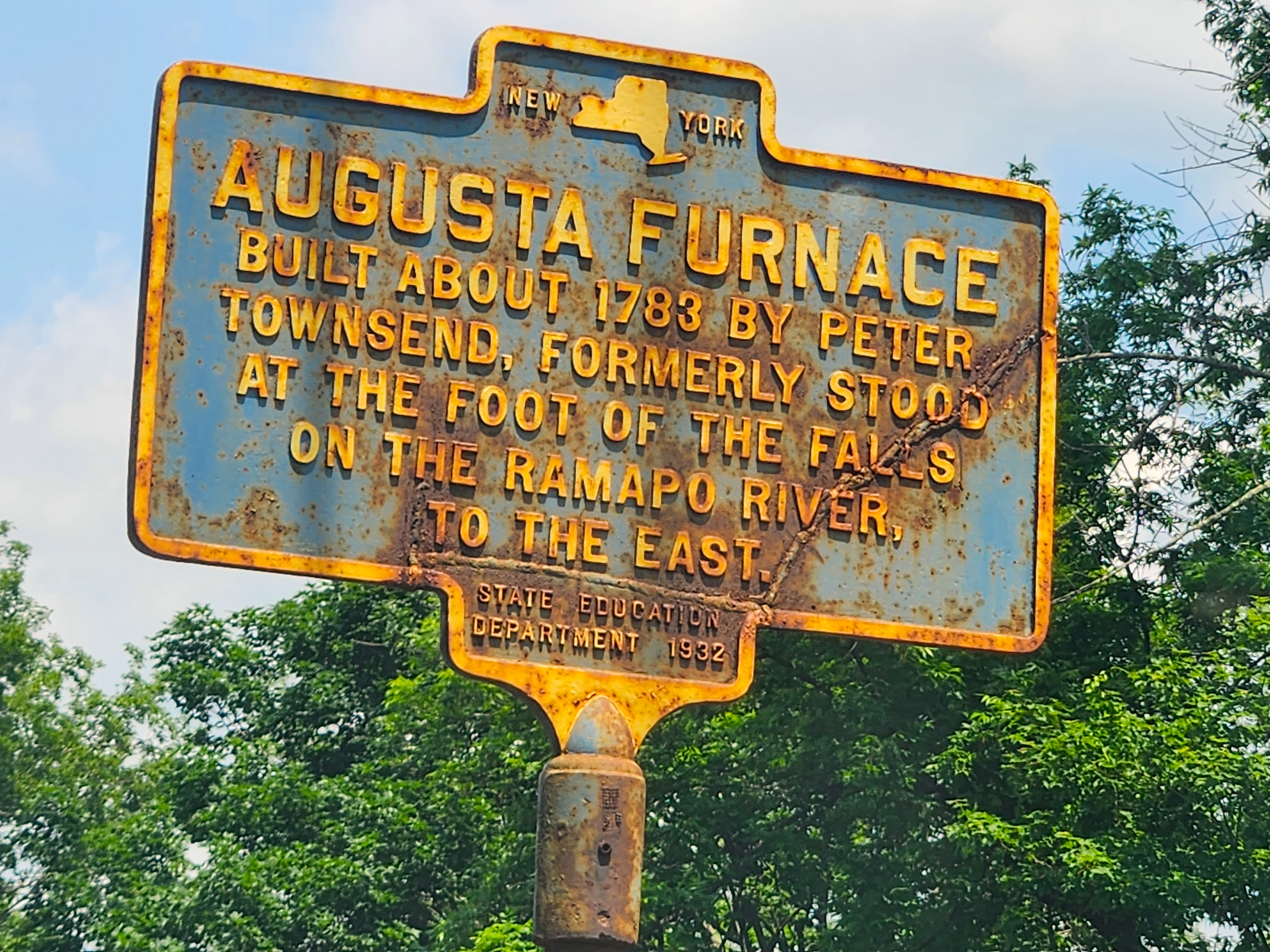
Augusta Furnace Historic Marker

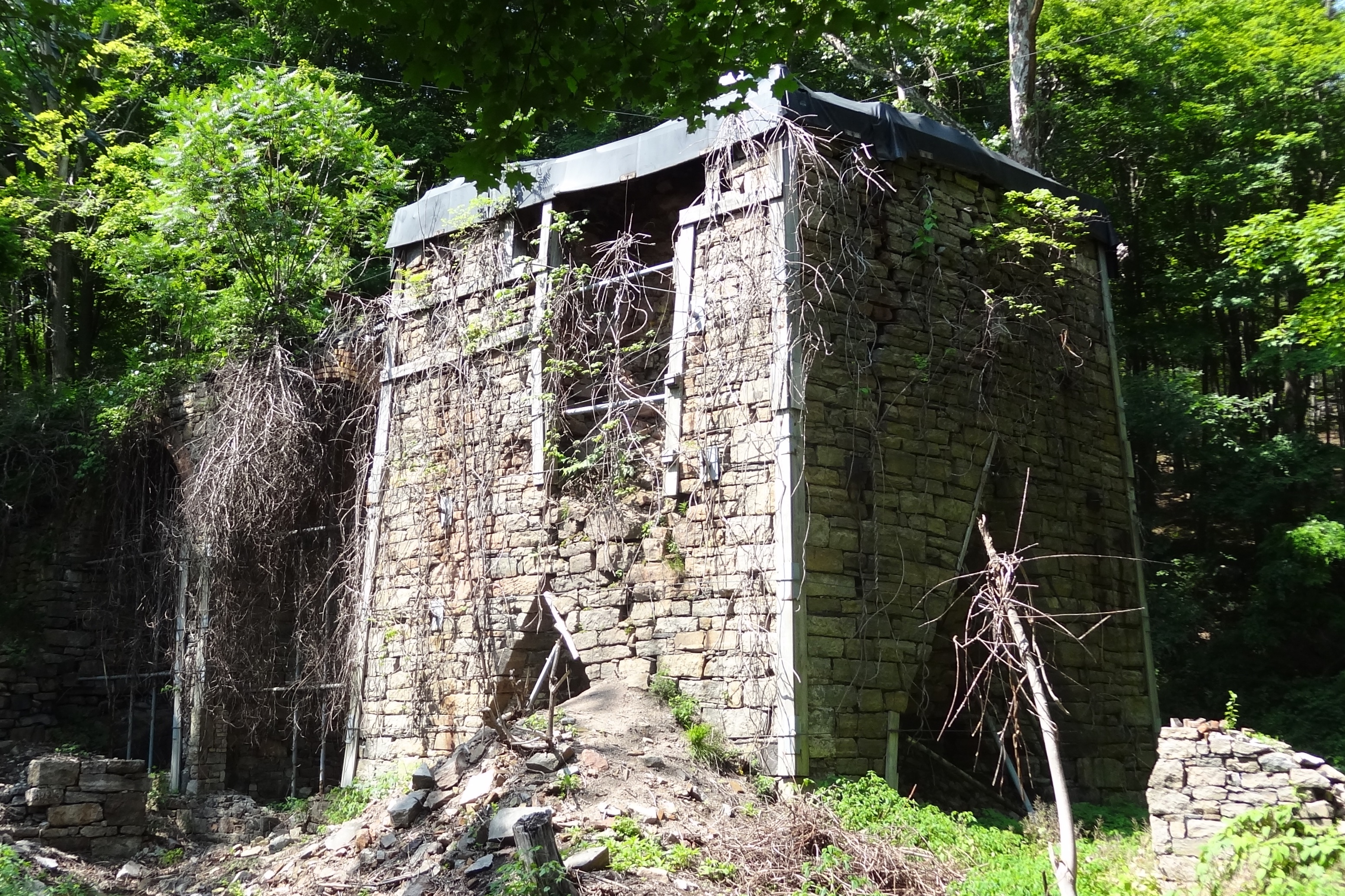
Southfield furnace ruin

In the 18th century, ethnic English and German colonists settled in the area. The men mostly worked at the nearby Sterling Iron Works in the neighboring Sterling Forest, as did some of the Ramapough Mountain Indians. Several men from the Tuxedo area served in the Revolutionary War.

In 1779 the rebel government built the Continental Road from Eagle Valley through the present-day village of Tuxedo Park to what is now Route 17 near Warwick Brook Road. The first industry in Tuxedo was the Augusta Forge at the falls on the Ramapo River, founded by Solomon Townsend in 1783, soon after the end of the war.

The town of Southfields (now part of the town of Tuxedo) was renamed Monroe in 1808. An iron forge was operated in this area, still known as Southfields; the forge ruins are still visible. The oldest documented structure in Tuxedo is the Adam Belcher house. Dating from 1790, it is located in the Southfields area.

=== 1800s ===
By 1812, the Augusta Forge went out of business. Townsend sold the 7,000-acre (2,800 ha) Augusta Tract to Pierre Lorillard II, who was in the tobacco business. Mining continued into the 1840s, until the iron ore was largely depleted. The Lorillards later used the tract for lumbering. It helped supply fuel for the wood-fired Erie Railroad, which was built in 1841.

The southern part of Tuxedo, known as Eagle Valley, was devoted to farming, as were areas just south of Lake Mombasha: Helmsburg and Bramertown were named after early colonial settlers. In the northern part of town, in the area known as Arden, the Greenwood Furnace was established in 1810. During the American Civil War, this forge produced the iron for the famous Parrott rifles, which were built at the West Point Foundry by the Parrott Brothers, then owners of the Greenwood tract.

The Southfields Methodist Church was built in 1848. The Parrotts built St. John's Episcopal Church in Arden in 1863. The cemetery along Route 17 in Arden was associated with St. Mary's Roman Catholic Church, built in 1867 but later closed due to demographic changes in residents. It was demolished. By the 1890s, the area iron industry had declined due to the decrease in ore and the discovery of the rich surface beds of the Mesabi Range in Minnesota.

The Town of Tuxedo was established twice from the Town of Monroe. First, in 1863 it was founded as the Town of Southfields by the Orange County Board of Supervisors, the legislative body of the county. The supervisors changed their decision in 1865 and the area was returned to Monroe. On December 19, 1889, the Board of Supervisors approved separating the Town of Tuxedo from Monroe. The act was implemented on March 4, 1890.

==== Tuxedo Park ====
Pierre Lorillard IV conceived the idea of the planned community of Tuxedo Park. In 1884 he began buying up his siblings' shares in the Augusta tract, with the intention of creating a hunting-and-fishing resort surrounding the 291-acre Tuxedo Lake. The mammoth development project, laid out by the architect Bruce Price and civil engineer Ernest W. Bowditch, was constructed by some 1,800 Italian and Slovak immigrant laborers in about eighteen months.

"When the Tuxedo Club opened on June 16, 1886, close to 5,000 acres [2,000 ha] had been planned, 30 miles [48 km] of macadam roads had been built, and 40 buildings stood complete. These were soon joined by a boathouse, a school, a racetrack, a golf course (possibly the second-oldest in the country), indoor tennis courts, a game preserve and breeding ponds, a swimming pool, an electrified toboggan run, 30 miles of bridle paths, and the first water, sewer, and telephone systems outside a major metropolis."

The resort attracted a number of the financial, industrial and social leaders of the day, particularly those who worked in New York City. During the first thirty years, more than 250 houses and stables were built in Tuxedo Park, as well as retail stores and service buildings in the so-called hamlet. Three churches, all still standing (one is used by the Tuxedo Historical Society today), a train station, a library, and a post office were also built, as well as a school and a hospital. Businessmen could commute by rail into New York City.

=== 1900s ===
By 1915, 3,636 people lived in Tuxedo, about 20% more than were reported in the 1890 Census.

A major shift in landholding in Tuxedo started after 1910, when Mrs. W. A. Harriman gave $1 million and 10,000 acres (4,000 ha) of her family's land to the Palisades Interstate Park Commission. The state gradually purchased additional farm and forest land from scores of owners, often by eminent domain, resulting in the present Bear Mountain-Harriman State Park, which occupies about 12,500 of Tuxedo's 30,700 acres (12,400 ha).

During the 1920s a new hospital and a high school were built by major donations from some residents. The Wall Street Crash of 1929 had a disproportionately adverse effect on Tuxedo Park's affluence, as numerous residents lost their financial jobs. A slow, but severe decline in the community's fortunes set in, resulting in a population decline and the loss of such amenities as the hospital, the Masonic Temple (now used as the Town Hall), and many retail stores.

In 1956, the Harrimans sold their Sterling Mine and Railroad Company tract to City Investing Company (now Sterling Forest LLC). It developed Maple Brook, Laurel Ridge, Clinton Woods and various offices and research centers on its 8,000 acres (3,200 ha) in the Town of Tuxedo.

In 1952, the area known as Tuxedo Park became an incorporated village. Today it comprises 2,050 acres (830 ha), of which 355 acres (144 ha) is three lakes, and about 340 housing units in 320 structures. Other newer housing developments include the Southfields Apartments built in 1971 on the site of a former bed factory, the Mountain View Apartments near the Sloatsburg line, and the Woodlands in Eagle Valley. Non-residential facilities include International Paper's Research Center, the Red Apple Restaurant, and the Sterling Forest Ski Area.

The men's evening wear known as a "tuxedo", the main component of "black tie" dress, was associated with the wealthy residents of Tuxedo Park.

The area known as Tuxedo Park separated from the Town of Tuxedo and became incorporated in 1952, adopting the village form of government. Today it comprises 2,050 acres (830 ha), of which 355 acres (144 ha) includes three lakes, and about 330 housing units in 340 structures. In recognition of its historical and architectural significance, the historic district was listed as Tuxedo Park on the National Register of Historic Places on March 13, 1980. In 1982 the designation was officially presented to Mrs. Joan Richardsson Alleman, Co-Chairman of the Tuxedo Conservation and Taxpayers Association, at the Washington's Headquarters State Historic Site in nearby Newburgh. The designation was presented by Mr. Oren Lehman, Commissioner of Parks, Recreation, and Historic Preservation and is proudly displayed at the Tuxedo Park Village Office.

=== Incorporation and Consolidation ===
On July 16, 2019, voters from the area of the town outside of Tuxedo Park voted to incorporate the rest of the town as the Village of Tuxedo, to prevent new incorporations of villages and to enable the town government to prevent oil pipelines from crossing the town. On the same day, voters from the entire town voted to immediately consolidate the new village with the town. Supporters of this referendum wanted to avoid the conflicts brought on by the Town of Woodbury and the Village of Woodbury having separate governments. The Village of Tuxedo subsequently incorporated on December 23, 2019, and the town and village governments consolidated on January 1, 2021.

== Geography ==
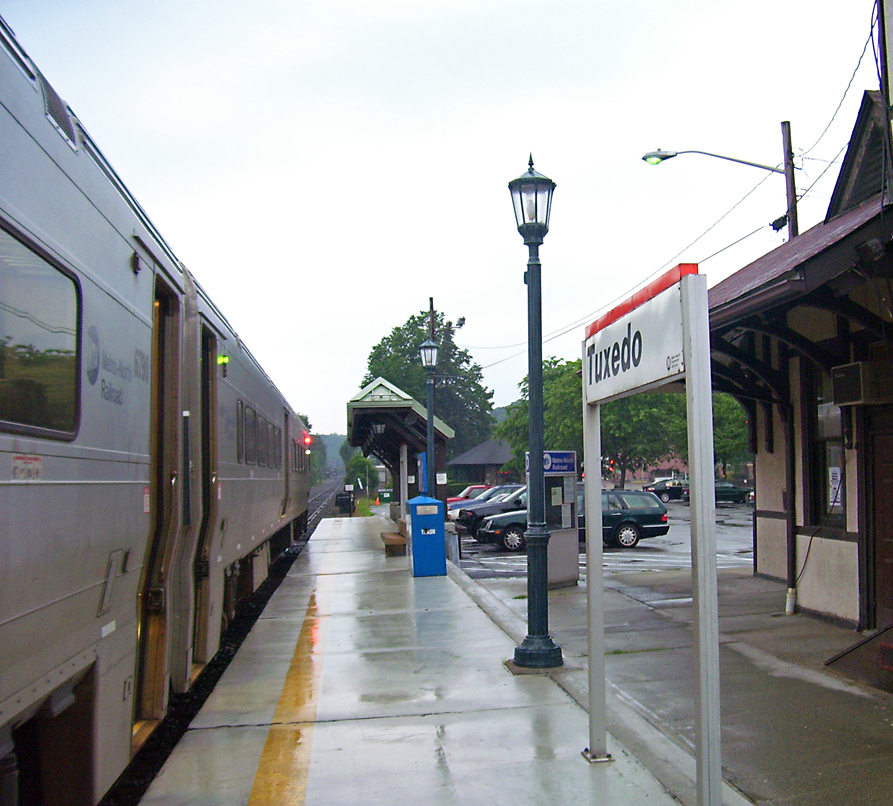
Tuxedo station is part of Metro-North Railroad's Port Jervis Line

According to the United States Census Bureau, the town has a total area of 49.4 square miles (128 km^{2}), of which 47.4 square miles (123 km^{2}) is land and 1.9 square miles (4.9 km^{2}) is water, for a total area of 3.89% water.

The eastern town line is the border of Rockland County. The Ramapo River flows through the town, which is situated in the Ramapo Mountains.

The New York State Thruway and NY-17 pass through the town.

== Demographics ==
Historical population
Census	Pop.	Note	%±
1890	1,678		—
1900	2,277		35.7%
1910	2,858		25.5%
1920	2,355		−17.6%
1930	2,606		10.7%
1940	2,314		−11.2%
1950	2,281		−1.4%
1960	2,227		−2.4%
1970	2,967		33.2%
1980	3,069		3.4%
1990	3,023		−1.5%
2000	3,334		10.3%
2010	3,624		8.7%
2020	3,811		5.2%
U.S. Decennial Census

As of the census of 2000, there were 3,334 people, 1,337 households, and 962 families residing in the town. The population density was 70.3 inhabitants per square mile (27.1/km^{2}). There were 1,457 housing units at an average density of 30.7 per square mile (11.9/km^{2}). The racial makeup of the town was 92.68% White, 1.23% African American, 0.33% Native American, 3.21% Asian, 0.00% Pacific Islander, 0.84% from other races, and 1.71% from two or more races. 4.26% of the population were Hispanic or Latino of any race.

== Entertainment ==
Tuxedo is the home of the annual New York Renaissance Faire.

== Education ==
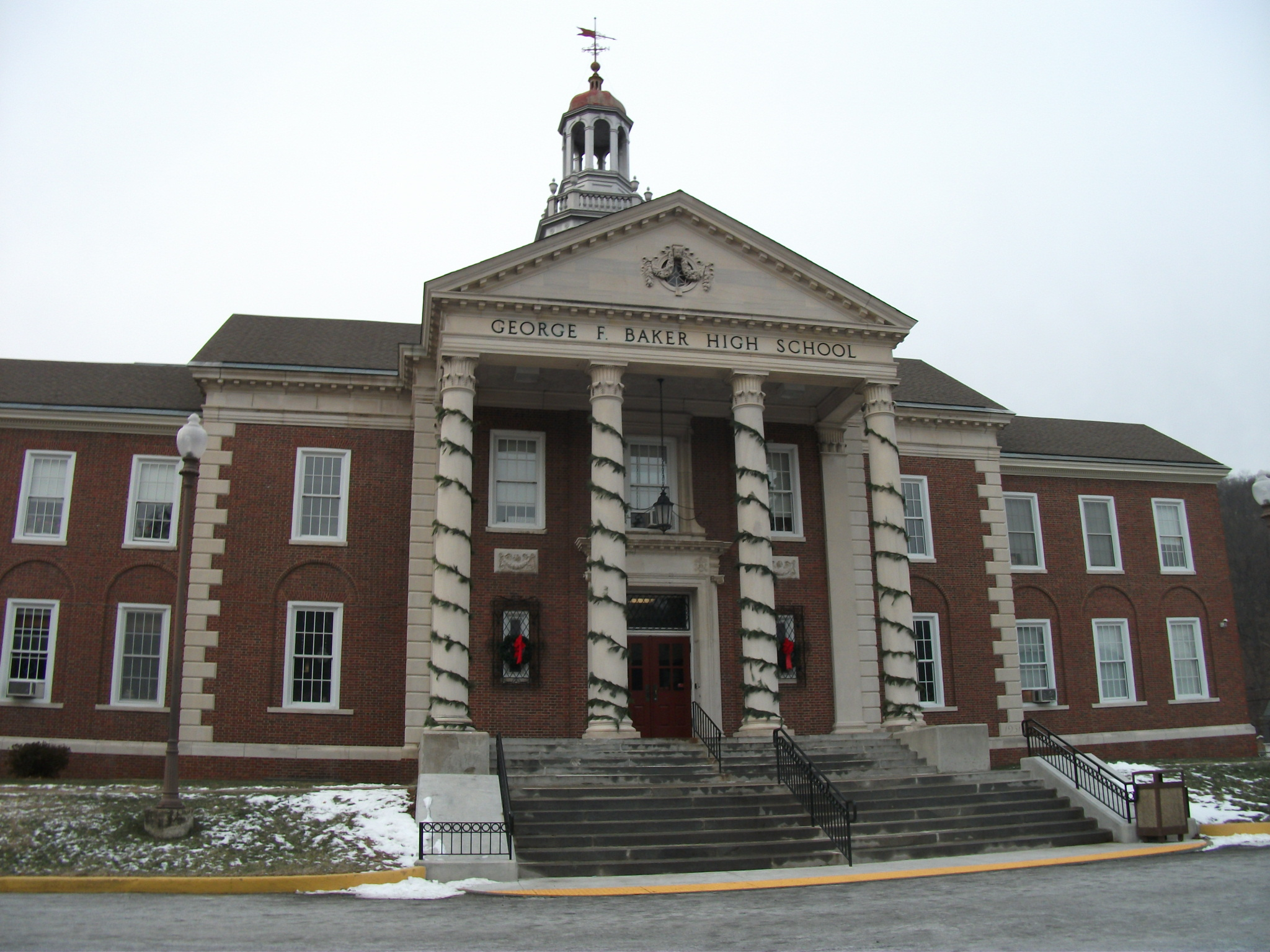
George F. Baker High School

The Tuxedo Union Free School District exists as the principal establishment of public education in the area, consisting of the George F. Baker High School and the George Grant Mason School. Tuxedo Park School is located within the village of Tuxedo Park, serving the general area.

== Communities and locations in Tuxedo ==
- Arden — A hamlet near the northern town line.
- Eagle Valley — A hamlet in the southern part of the town.
- Harriman State Park — Part of the state park is in the town.
- Indian Hill — A hamlet in the northern part of the town.
- Southfields — A hamlet north of Tuxedo Park on highway NY-17.
- Sterling Forest — A hamlet north of Tuxedo Park on highway NY-17A. Location of Sterling Forest State Park.
- Tuxedo Lake — A lake in the southern part of the town.
- Tuxedo Park — A village in the southern part of the town near highway NY-17.

== Notable person ==
- Walt Weiss, former MLB player and manager, currently the manager for the Atlanta Braves
