= Southfield Furnace Ruin =

- U.S. National Register of Historic Places
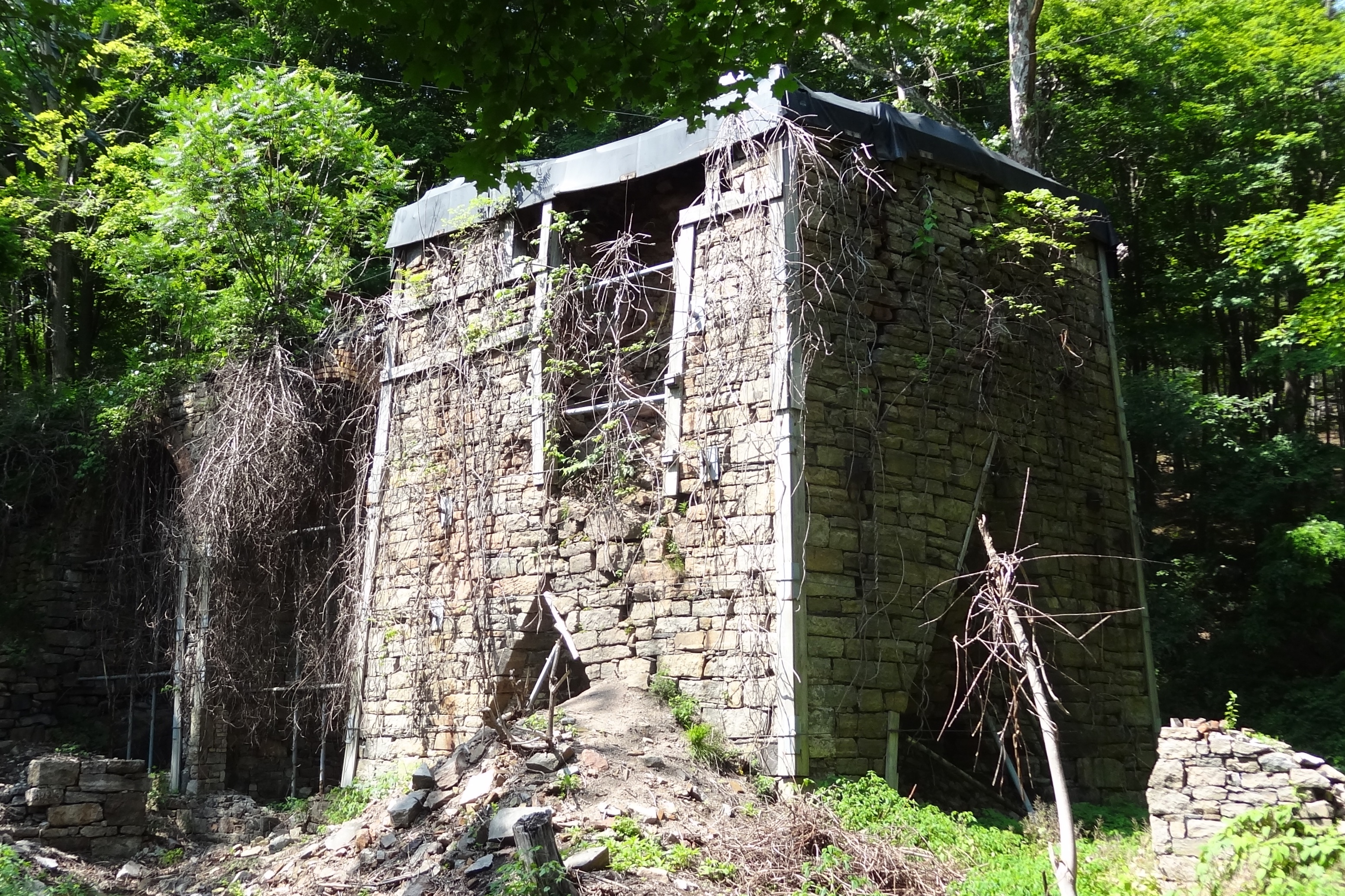
- Ruin in 2015

- Location within New York Location within the United States
- Location: Southfields, New York
- Coordinates: 41°15′14″N 74°10′57″W
- Area: less than one acre
- Built: 1804
- Built by: Peter Townsend, et al.
- NRHP reference No.: 73001243
- Added to NRHP: November 2, 1973

The Southfield Furnace Ruin in Southfields, New York, was a longtime smelting site for iron ore mined from nearby veins in what is now Sterling Forest State Park. It is located on the north side of Orange County Route 19, 0.7 miles northwest of the junction with New York State Route 17.

It was added to the National Register of Historic Places on November 2, 1973 for its significance in industry.

== History ==
It was built by Peter Townsend II, who also owned the mines. The Southfield Ironworks in addition to the furnace included a stamping mill, grist mill, saw mill, smith shop, wheel wright shop, coal shed, store, and stables.

The furnace was shut down in September 1887.

== Gallery ==
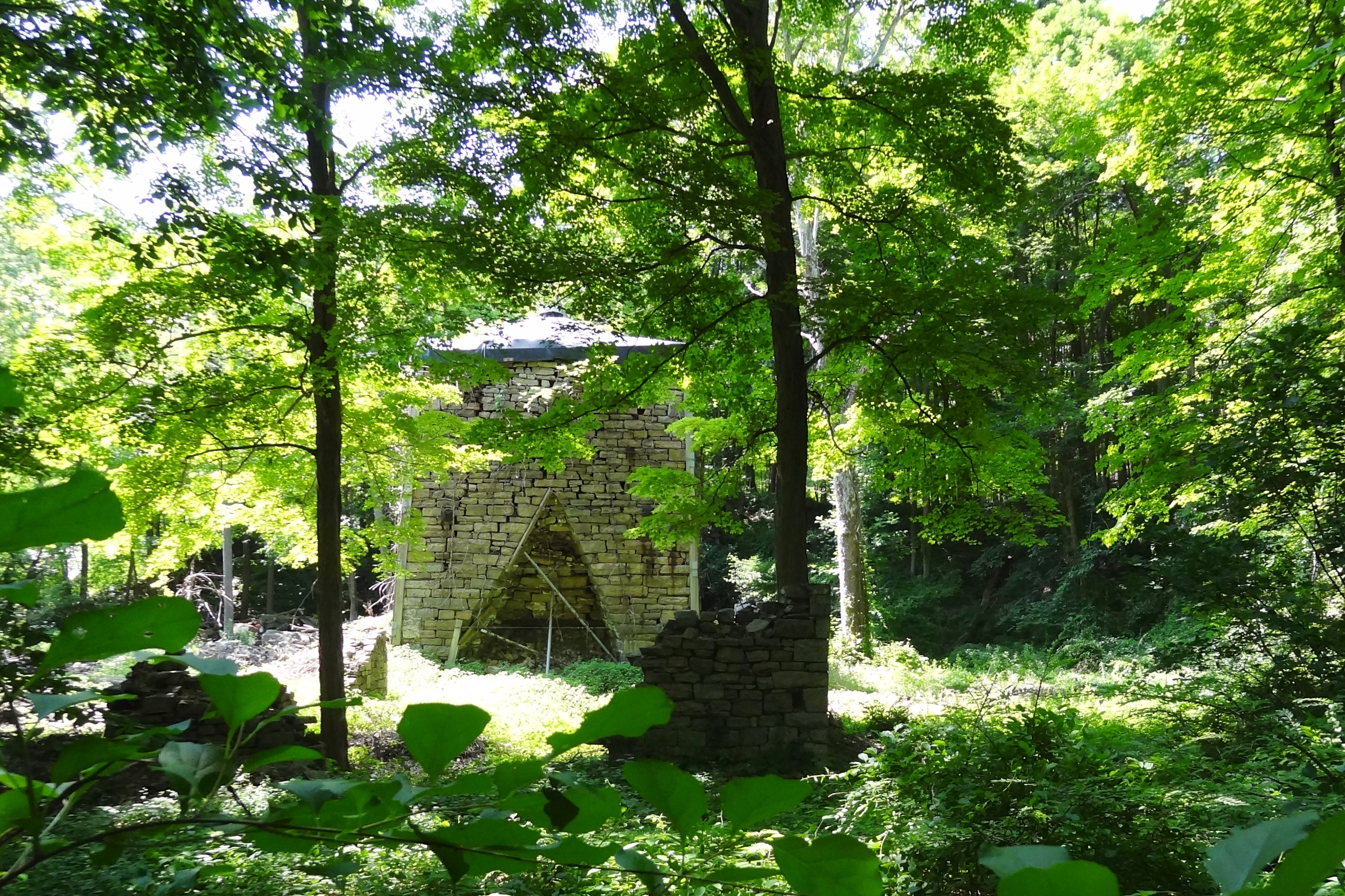
Area view of the ruin

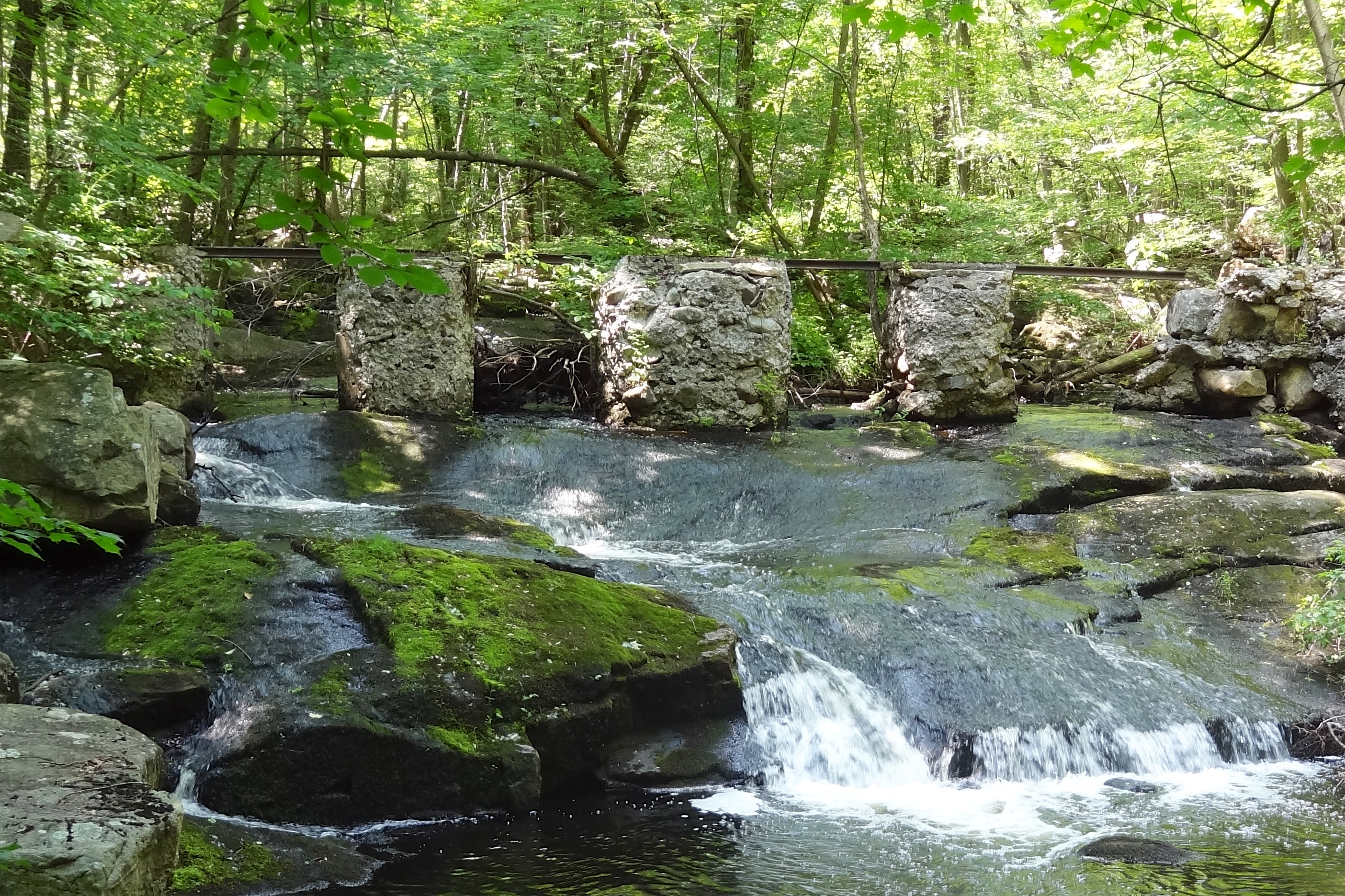
Abandoned railroad crossing

== See also ==
- National Register of Historic Places in Orange County, New York
- Clove Furnace Ruin
