= Baker High School =

Baker High School may refer to one of these secondary schools in the United States:

- Baker High School (Alabama)
- Baker High School (California), member of the Hi-Lo League
- Baker High School (Georgia)
- Baker High School (Louisiana)
- Baker High School (Montana), attended by Shann Schillinger
- Baker High School (Oregon)
- Charles W. Baker High School (Baldwinsville, New York)
- George F. Baker High School (Tuxedo, New York)
- Ida S. Baker High School (Cape Coral, Florida)

== See also ==
- Baker County High School (disambiguation)
