= Sterling Lake =

- Sterling Pond
- Location within New York Location within the United States
- Location: Orange County, New York
- Coordinates: 41°12′26″N 74°15′33″W
- Type: Natural lake
- Part of: Ramapo River Watershed
- Primary outflows: Ringwood River
- Basin countries: United States
- Surface area: 288 acres (1.17 km^{2})
- Max. depth: 120 ft (37 m)
- Shore length^{1}: 4 miles (6.4 km)
- Surface elevation: 751 ft (229 m)
- ^{1} Shore length is not a well-defined measure.

Sterling Lake is located in Sterling Forest State Park, New York. The lake contains a number of fish species including Lake Trout, Largemouth Bass, Smallmouth Bass, Chain Pickerel and Panfish. Fishing is permitted from the shore only; no boating is allowed on the lake, and the use of bait-fish is prohibited. There are a number of scenic hiking trails around the lake. One of the trails leads to the Sterling Mountain Fire Observation Tower and Observer's Cabin which provides a 360 degree view of the forest, including Sterling Lake.

As of 2018, the Sterling Lake System, operated by SUEZ North America (formerly United Water), supplies drinking water from Sterling Lake to about 225 people.

== History ==
The Sterling Lake area is rich in magnetite deposits. Since before the American Revolution, this area was an important source of iron ore for the colonies. Ore was discovered at the site of the old Sterling Mine in 1750, on the south shore of the lake. This led to the establishment of what would become known as the Sterling Iron Works. Another mine, called the Lake Mine, ran underneath Sterling Lake for some 3,800 feet at a depth of about 900 feet. The mines were finally closed in 1921. The underground workings of both these mines are now flooded.
