= Tuxedo Park, New York =

- Village
- Village of Tuxedo Park
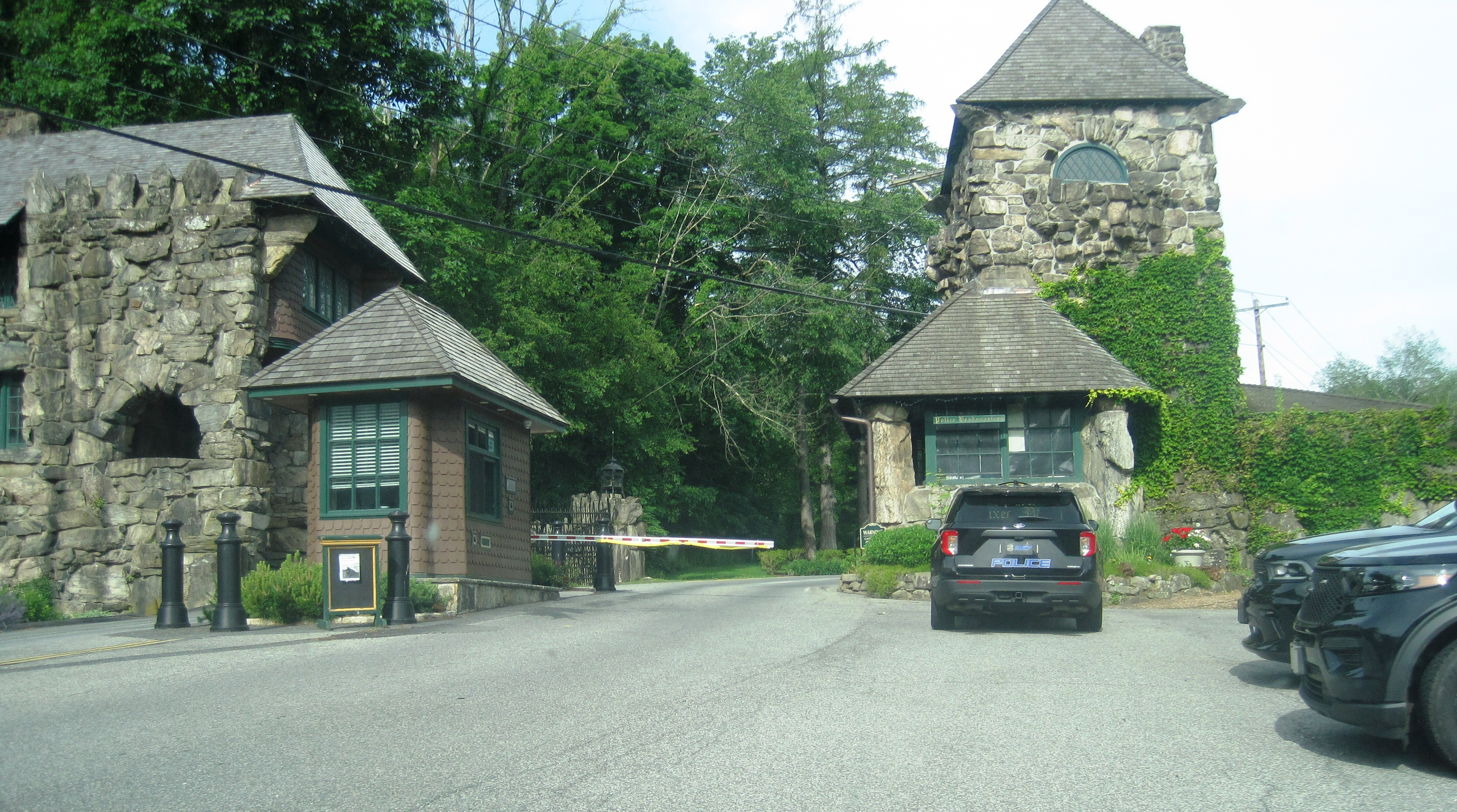
- The main entrance to Tuxedo Park

- Location in the state of New York and in Orange County
- Coordinates: 41°12′5″N 74°12′6″W
- Country: United States
- State: New York
- County: Orange
- Town: Tuxedo

Government
  - Mayor: Marc D. Citrin

Area
  - Total: 3.22 sq mi (8.35 km^{2})
  - Land: 2.66 sq mi (6.88 km^{2})
  - Water: 0.56 sq mi (1.46 km^{2})
- Elevation: 407 ft (124 m)

Population (2020)
  - Total: 645
  - Density: 242.8/sq mi (93.73/km^{2})
- Time zone: UTC−5 (Eastern (EST))
  - Summer (DST): UTC−4 (EDT)
- ZIP Code: 10987
- Area code: 845
- FIPS code: 36-75803
- GNIS feature ID: 0968011
- Website: tuxedopark-ny.gov
- Tuxedo Park, New York
- U.S. National Register of Historic Places
- U.S. Historic district
- Location within New York Location within the United States
- Location: Tuxedo Park, New York
- Built: 1886
- Architects: Bruce Price; McKim, Mead & White; Russell Sturgis
- Architectural style: Tudor Revival, Italianate, Queen Anne
- NRHP reference No.: 80002740
- Added to NRHP: March 13, 1980

Tuxedo Park is a village in Orange County, New York, United States. Its population was 645 at the 2020 census. It is part of the Kiryas Joel–Poughkeepsie–Newburgh metropolitan area as well as the larger New York metropolitan area. Its name is derived from an indigenous Lenape word ptukwsiit (Munsee dialect) or tùkwsit (Unami dialect), meaning "round foot" or Wolf Clan. While there exists an alternative theory regarding the Munsee word p'tuxseepu, which is said to mean 'crooked water' or 'crooked river', the Unami name for this location survives: tùkwsitu, "place of the Wolf-Clan People".

Tuxedo Park is a gated village in the southern part of the town of Tuxedo, near New York Route 17 and the New York State Thruway.

The evening dress for men now popularly known as a tuxedo takes its name from Tuxedo Park. It was brought there by James Brown Potter, who was introduced to the garment by the Prince of Wales (later Edward VII).

== History ==
The park is in the Ramapo Mountains. In the colonial era, it acquired a reputation for undeveloped iron deposits. In consequence, a company formed in England and headed by William Alexander, Lord Stirling, acquired a large tract in the neighborhood. The company built furnaces near Ringwood and opened mines on the Ramapo River near Sterling Lake. Pierre Lorillard II acquired the company and its land holdings in 1790. Once the iron deposits were depleted, the land was used for lumbering.

What is now the village and the areas immediately surrounding it were first developed as a private hunting-and-fishing reserve by Pierre Lorillard IV in 1885. At that time, it became known as "Tuxedo Park". Lorillard IV initially built small cottages, renting or selling them to his friends and family. The project grew so popular that he organized the Tuxedo Club and the Tuxedo Park Association, and he surrounded the property with a high game fence. This fence fairly accurately marked the present boundaries of the area restricted to the use of the residents of Tuxedo Park. In 1924, the Tuxedo Securities Corporation acquired from the Estate of Peter Lorillard, deceased, all of the stock of the Tuxedo Park Association.

The original clubhouse, designed by Bruce Price, was built in 1886 and replaced by a second clubhouse in 1928, which was designed by John Russell Pope. This building was destroyed by fire in 1943, and it was partially rebuilt soon after.

The shingle style cottages that Price built at Tuxedo – with their compact massing and axial plans – influenced Modernist architects, including Frank Lloyd Wright. Queen Anne style architecture with Tudor elements became popular for residences.

Tuxedo Park enjoyed many prosperous years from 1885 until the 1920s. The Blue Book of Etiquette was written by Emily Post, who was the daughter of Bruce Price. She wrote the book based on what she observed inside the great stone gates of Tuxedo Park.

Other notable residents from that era included:

- Grenville Kane – banker, heir, and longtime resident
- Dorothy Draper – interior designer
- Adele Colgate – heir to the Colgate/Palmolive fortune
- Fernando Yznaga – banker; brother of Consuelo Yznaga, Duchess of Manchester
- Louis Ogden – Lawyer who took photos of the RMS Titanic rescue operation on board the RMS Carpathia
- George Fisher Baker – banker
- J. P. Morgan – banker
- Alfred Lee Loomis – investment banker, scientist
- William Waldorf Astor
- Herbert C. Pell
- Augustus Juilliard
- Millicent Rogers
- James Whitmore

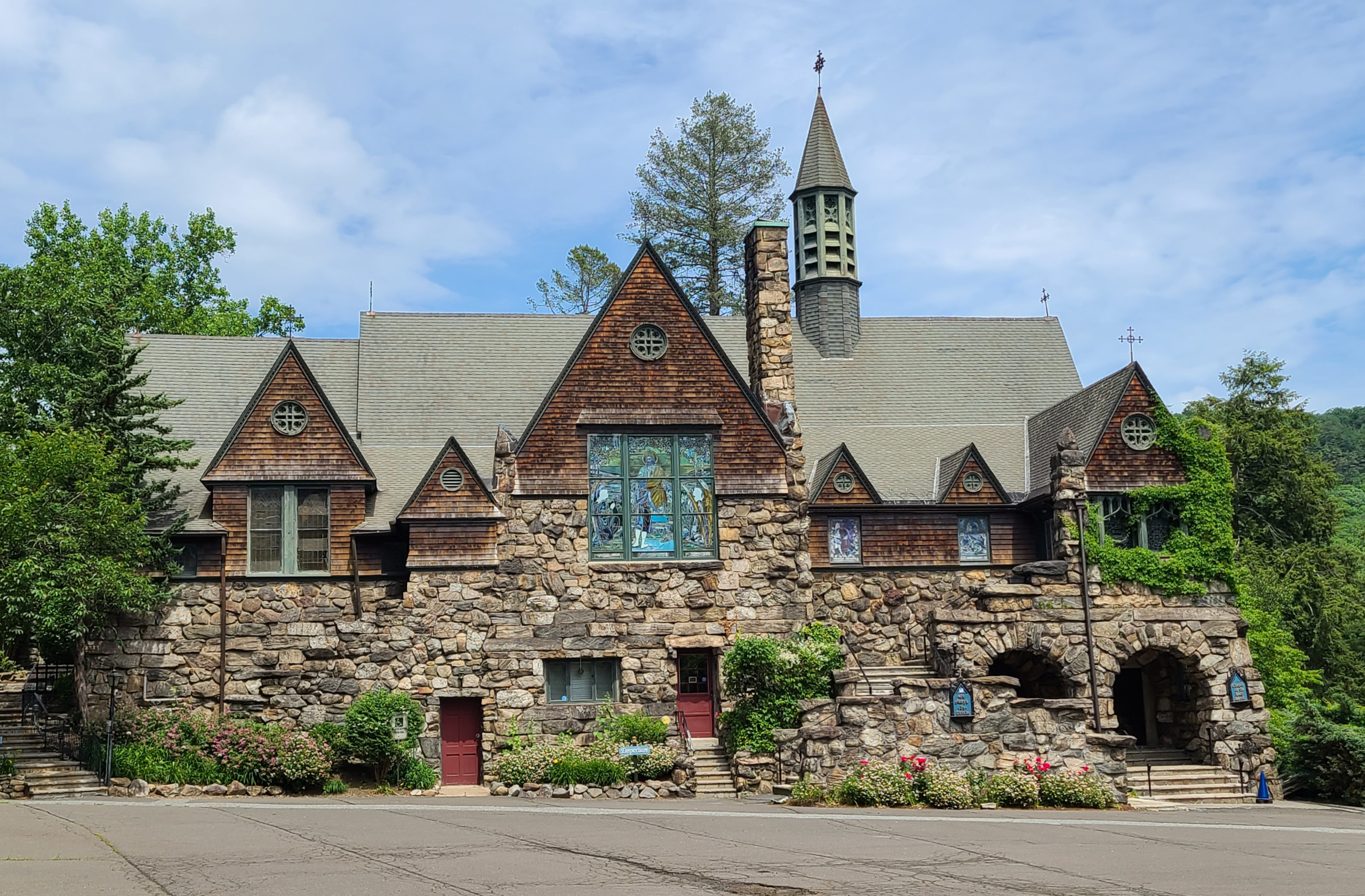
St. Mary's-in-Tuxedo Episcopal Church (1888), William Appleton Potter, architect

During the 1920s, a new hospital and a high school were built through the generosity of a few Tuxedo Park residents, including John Insley Blair. In the years following the Great Depression, however, Tuxedo Park lost many of its socialites and wealthy inhabitants, but it attracted some new ones as well. One of the new residences was built by Angier Biddle Duke (cousin to Doris Duke), whose father-in-law, George Baker St. George, was an original resident of Tuxedo. St. George purchased and built for Duke and his wife, Priscilla St. George, a new estate named "Duck Hollow". Duck Hollow was the last estate built in Tuxedo Park by the old "blue blood elite". While Duke and his wife were traveling abroad, as most elites did at that time, St. George had landscape architect Arthur P. Kroll landscape the property. By the time the Dukes returned from Europe, the property had been transformed and appeared to have been there for over 100 years.

The area known as Tuxedo Park separated from the Town of Tuxedo and became incorporated in 1952, adopting the village form of government. Today, it includes 2,050 acres (8.3 km^{2}), of which 355 acres (1.44 km^{2}) includes three lakes, and about 330 housing units in 340 structures. Other newer housing developments outside of the gated Village of Tuxedo Park but in the Town of Tuxedo include the Tuxedo Heights Condominiums in Southfields, built in 1971 on the site of a former bed factory, the Mountain View Apartments near the Sloatsburg line, and The Woodlands at Tuxedo (townhomes HOA) in the Eagle Valley section. The former mansion of Alfred Lee Loomis is sometimes referred to as the Loomis Laboratory, and it is now private rental apartments inside the Village of Tuxedo Park.

Outside of the gated Village of Tuxedo Park, in the Town of Tuxedo, were the former Red Apple Rest and the Sterling Forest Ski Center, aka Tuxedo Ridge Ski Resort. This former ski property is home to the New York Renaissance Festival and various sporting events, including Spartan Races. Also in the Town of Tuxedo is a former International Paper Research Center, today owned and occupied by Watchtower Organization. Just outside the gates of Tuxedo Park is the Hamlet of The Town of Tuxedo, which consists of numerous historic structures built around the time of the original Tuxedo Park development. Historic buildings include the Tuxedo Train station (Metro-North stop Tuxedo), the Tuxedo Park Library (designed by Bruce Price), the Tuxedo Park Post Office and Our Lady of Mt. Carmel Catholic Church.

In recognition of its historical and architectural significance, the historic district was listed as "Tuxedo Park" on the National Register of Historic Places on March 13, 1980.

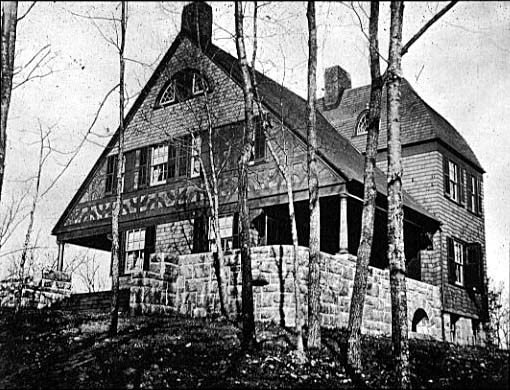
William Kent cottage (1885–86; demolished), Bruce Price, architect

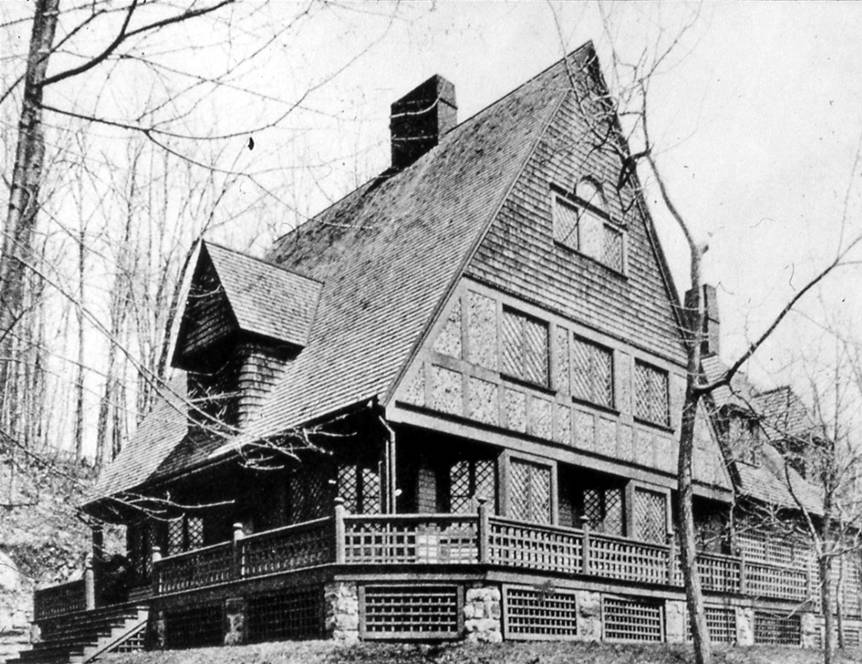
W. Chanler cottage (1885–86), Bruce Price, architect

Mansion of Henry W. Poor (of Standard & Poor's), 1903

Mark Twain at the Voss cottage, 1907

== Geography ==
Tuxedo Park is at 41°12′5″N 74°12′6″W (41.201461, -74.201668).

According to the United States Census Bureau, the village has an area of 3.2 square miles (8.3 km^{2}), of which 2.7 square miles (7.0 km^{2}) is land and 0.6 square miles (1.6 km^{2}) (17.03%) is water.

The village is in Orange County near its border with Rockland County, in the Ramapo Mountains.

The New York State Thruway (Interstate 87) and New York State Route 17 pass east of the village, which is north of Sloatsburg.

Sterling Forest State Park is west of the village, and Harriman State Park is to the east.

Within the confines of the village are three lakes: Tuxedo Lake is the largest by far of the three and serves as the village reservoir, while the smaller Weewah Lake and Pond #2 serve as purely recreational bodies of water. No swimming or power-boating is allowed in Tuxedo Lake in order to retain optimal water quality.

== Demographics ==
Historical population
Census	Pop.	Note	%±
1960	723		—
1970	861		19.1%
1980	809		−6.0%
1990	706		−12.7%
2000	731		3.5%
2010	623		−14.8%
2020	645		3.5%
U.S. Decennial Census

As of the census of 2000, there were 731 people, 291 households, and 215 families residing in the village. The population density was 272.9 inhabitants per square mile (105.4/km^{2}). There were 363 housing units at an average density of 135.5 per square mile (52.3/km^{2}). The racial makeup of the village was 94.4% white, 0.7% African American, 0.1% Native American, 2.2% Asian, 0.3% from other races, and 2.3% from two or more races. Hispanic or Latino of any race were 5.1% of the population.

There were 291 households, out of which 29.6% had children under the age of 18 living with them, 63.9% were married couples living together, 8.9% had a female householder with no husband present, and 26.1% were non-families. 21.6% of all households were made up of individuals, and 7.9% had someone living alone who was 65 years of age or older. The average household size was 2.51 and the average family size was 2.88.

In the village, the age distribution of the population shows 22.2% under the age of 18, 5.1% from 18 to 24, 23.3% from 25 to 44, 37.3% from 45 to 64, and 12.2% who were 65 years of age or older. The median age was 45 years. For every 100 females, there were 98.1 males. For every 100 females age 18 and over, there were 94.9 males.

The median income for a household in the village was $91,820, and the median income for a family was $102,056. Males had a median income of $70,536 versus $46,250 for females. The per capita income for the village was $63,538. About 1.9% of families and 4.4% of the population were below the poverty line, including 2.7% of those under age 18 and none of those age 65 or over.

== Education ==
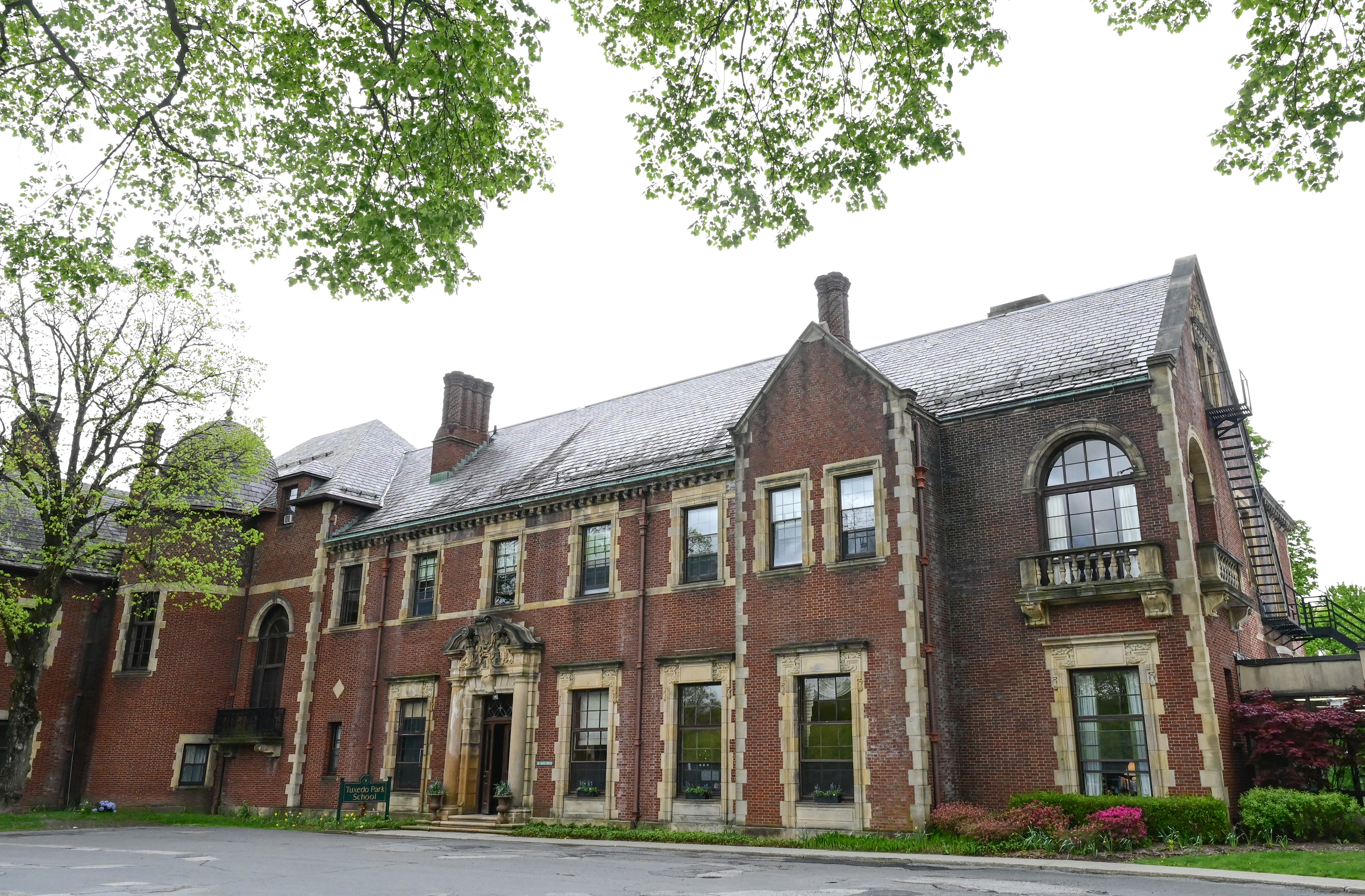
Tuxedo Park School

It is in the Tuxedo Union Free School District.

== Notable people ==
- Albert Einstein, theoretical physicist
- Dorothy Draper, American designer, interior decorator
- Thibaut de Saint Phalle, American investment banker, former director of the Export–Import Bank of the United States
- Sutton Foster, actress, dancer, and singer
- Fred Gwynne, actor
- Alfred Lee Loomis, attorney, investment banker, scientist, physicist, inventor of the LORAN, funded RADAR development before the government funded it
- Charles E. Mitchell (October 6, 1877 – December 14, 1955), an American banker whose incautious securities policies facilitated the speculation which led to the Crash of 1929
- Ambrose Monell, American industrialist, former president of International Nickel Company and namesake of the Monel alloy
- Charles Coudert Nast, attorney and U.S. Army major general
- Howard Shore, composer
- Katharine St. George, former US Congressman
- John F. (Jack) White, president of National Educational Television and the Cooper Union for the Advancement of Science and Art
- Katherine Rosman, a reporter for the New York Times
- Gary Parr, investment banker
- Henry Varnum Poor, founder of Standard & Poor’s
- Guy Spier, hedge fund manager

== Notable locations ==
- Jehovah's Witnesses World Headquarters
- I.B.M. Sterling Forest

== See also ==
- Tuxedo Club
- Tuxedo Park School
