= Clove Furnace Ruin =

Building in Arden, New York, United States

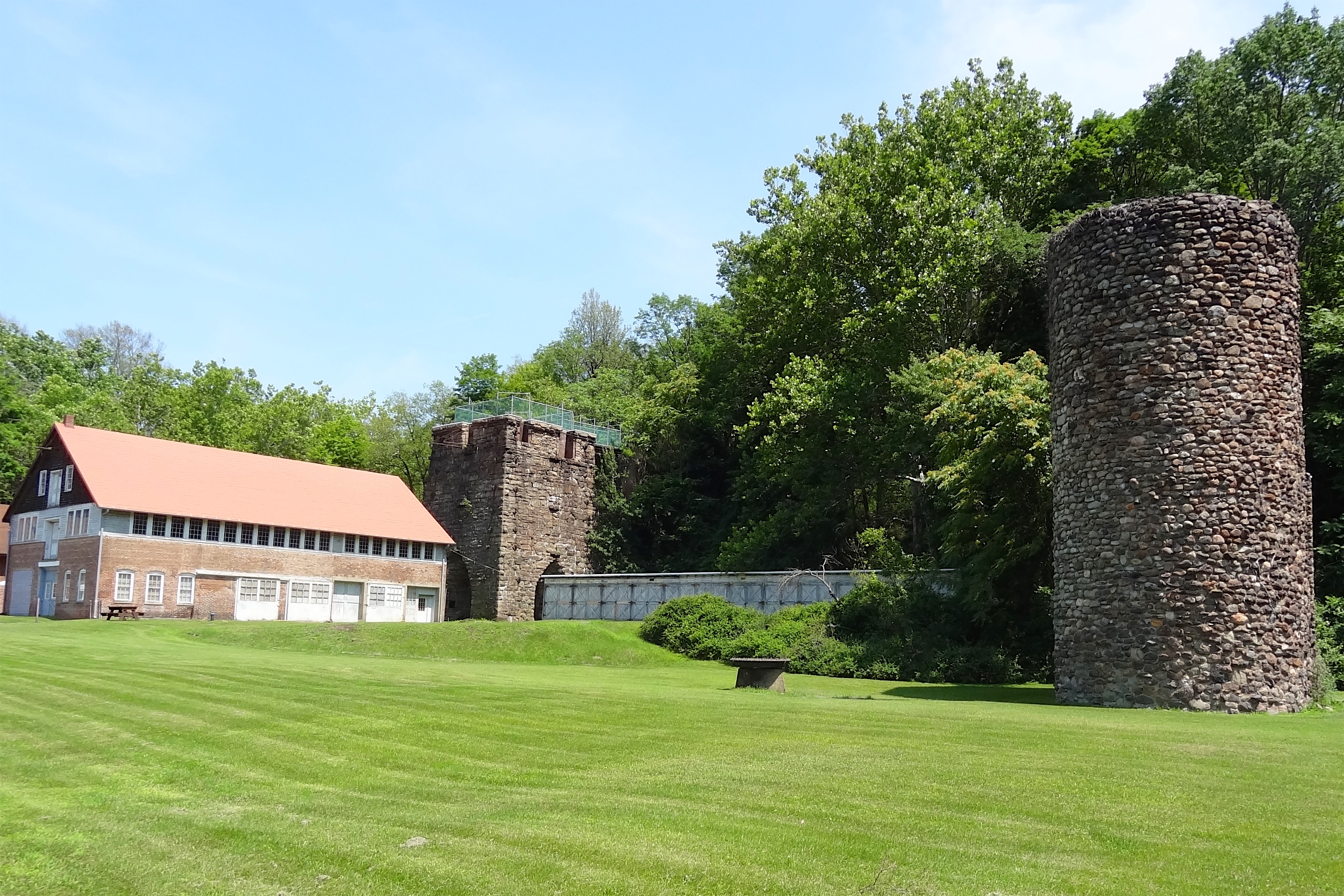
- Buildings in 2015
- Interactive map of the Clove Furnace Ruin area

General information
- Location: Arden, NY
- Coordinates: 41°16′24″N 74°09′00″W

The Clove Furnace Ruin in Arden, New York, United States, was a longtime smelting site for iron ore mined from nearby veins in what is now Harriman State Park. It is located on Arden Station Road just east of the New York State Thruway, and can easily be seen from the highway. It was built in 1854 by Robert & Peter Parrott, who also owned and operated numerous mines in the area, known collectively as the Greenwood Iron Works. Together with the Greenwood Furnace (c.1810), located roughly one half mile east of Clove, these two furnaces produced iron which supplied the Parrott's West Point Foundry at Cold Spring, NY. The foundry produced the famous and highly effective Parrott rifle, a type of cannon used by the Union army during the Civil War. The furnace shut down permanently, shortly after Robert Parrott's death in 1877.

It is located on Arden, which was formerly a property of Columbia University.

== See also ==
- Southfield Furnace Ruin
