= Blue Lake (New York) =

- Sterling Forest Lake
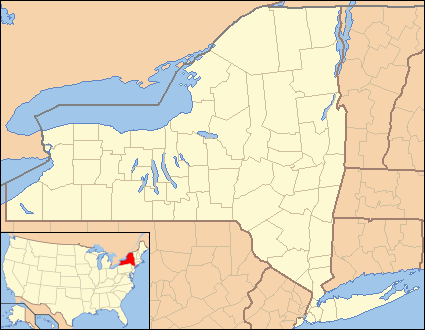
- Location within New York Location within the United States
- Location: Orange County, New York
- Coordinates: 41.163288°N 74.259774°W
- Type: Reservoir
- Part of: Ramapo River Watershed
- Primary outflows: Ringwood River
- Basin countries: United States
- First flooded: 1956
- Surface area: 115 acres (0.47 km^{2})
- Max. depth: 26 ft (7.9 m)
- Shore length^{1}: 2.3 miles (3.7 km)
- Surface elevation: 650 ft (200 m)
- ^{1} Shore length is not a well-defined measure.

Blue Lake, also called Sterling Forest Lake, is located in Sterling Forest State Park, New York. As of 2018, the Blue Lake Reservoir System, operated by SUEZ North America (formerly United Water), supplies drinking water from Blue Lake to about 1,200 people.

== Overview ==
The lake is the largest of many smaller lakes in the state park. The lake contains a number of fish species including Brown Trout, Rainbow Trout, Largemouth Bass, Chain Pickerel and Panfish. Fishing is permitted and the lake has the only boat launch within the state park, but no gas motors are allowed.

== History ==
Blue Lake was created in 1956 when the stream originating at Little Cedar Pond to the northwest was dammed, inundating the area. In 1960, the International Nickel Company (INCO) purchased property overlooking the lake where they built a facility. That facility, which ceased operation in the late 1980s, included a headquarters office and a research center called the Paul D. Merica Laboratory. After remaining vacant for decades, the old INCO facility was replaced in 2016 by the newly constructed world headquarters of Jehovah's Witnesses. The only other facility adjacent to Blue Lake was built in the early 1970s and used by IBM; it was also purchased by the Jehovah's Witnesses in 2026.
