= Arden, New York =

- Hamlet
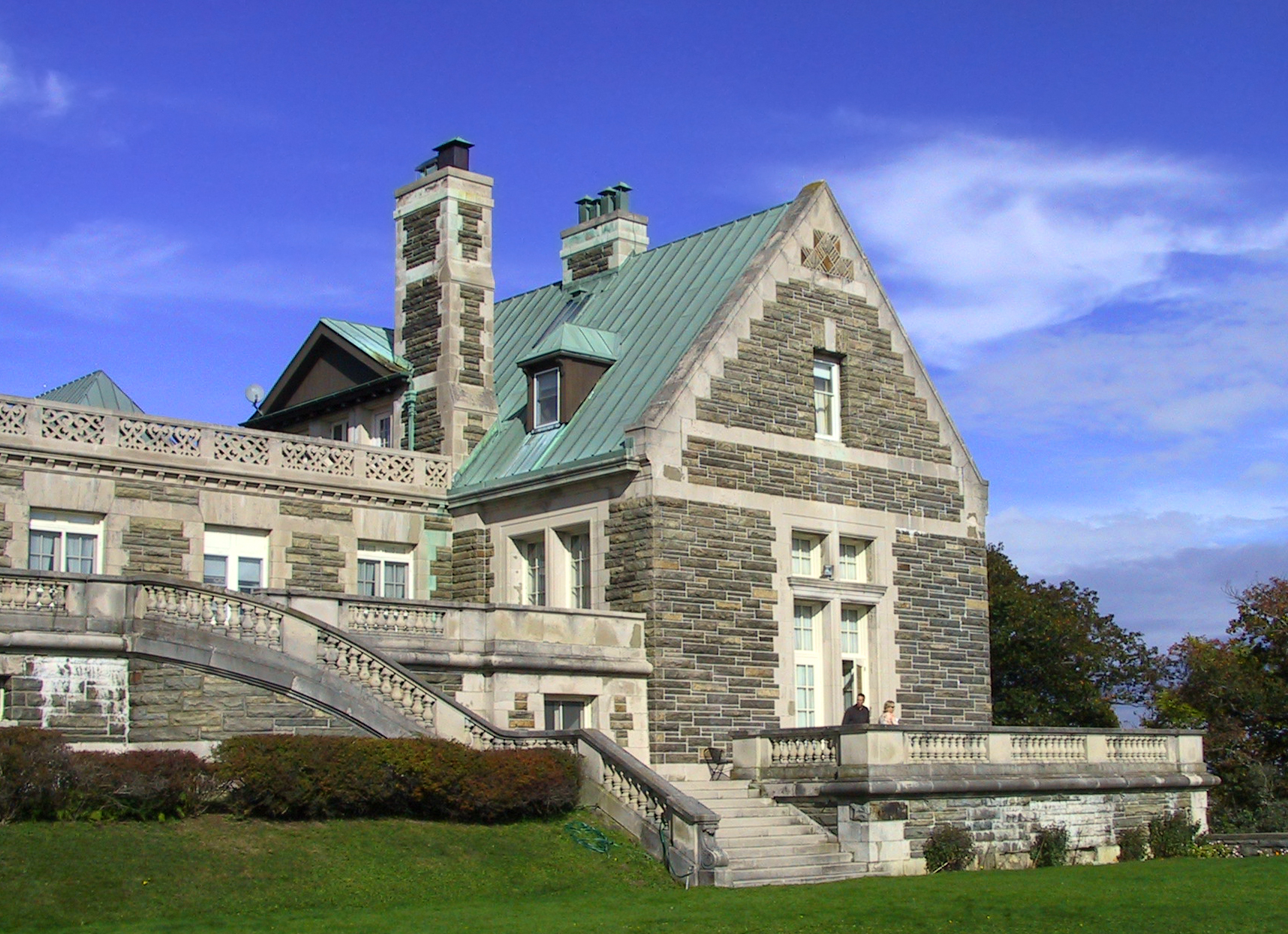
- Wing of the home on the Arden estate in 2003

- Location within the state of New York
- Coordinates: 41°16′N 74°9′W
- Country: United States
- State: New York
- County: Orange
- Elevation: 210 ft (64 m)
- Time zone: UTC-5 (Eastern (EST))
  - Summer (DST): UTC-4 (EDT)
- ZIP code: 10910

Arden is a hamlet around the town line of the Orange County towns of Tuxedo and Monroe in the "boot" of New York, United States, west of the Hudson River. It is roughly coterminous with the 10910 ZIP Code.

The area was originally known as Greenwood, and was noted for the iron works belonging to Robert and Peter P. Parrott, of Parrott gun fame. The Greenwood Furnace was established in 1810; during the American Civil War, the furnace produced the iron for the famous Parrott Gun, which was built in Cold Spring by the Parrott brothers. The Parrotts built St. John's Episcopal Church in Arden in 1863. By the 1890s, the iron industry in New York was in decline due to the discovery of surface beds of iron in Minnesota.

The hamlet takes its current name from the Arden estate built in the area by railroad magnate Edward H. Harriman in the late 19th century. It is today a National Historic Landmark, but not open to the public. The Open Space Institute acquired the building and 540 surrounding acres from Columbia University for $4.5 million in 2007. In 2011, the Open Space Institute sold the Arden Estate property to another nonprofit organization for $4.5 million.

== See also ==
- Arden (estate)
- Clove Furnace Ruin

== Sources ==
- Myles, William J., Harriman Trails, A Guide and History, The New York-New Jersey Trail Conference, New York, N.Y., 1999.
