= Baker County High School =

Baker County High School may refer to:

- Baker County High School (Newton, Georgia), US
- Baker County High School (Glen St. Mary, Florida), US

== See also ==
- Baker High School (disambiguation)
