= George F. Baker High School =

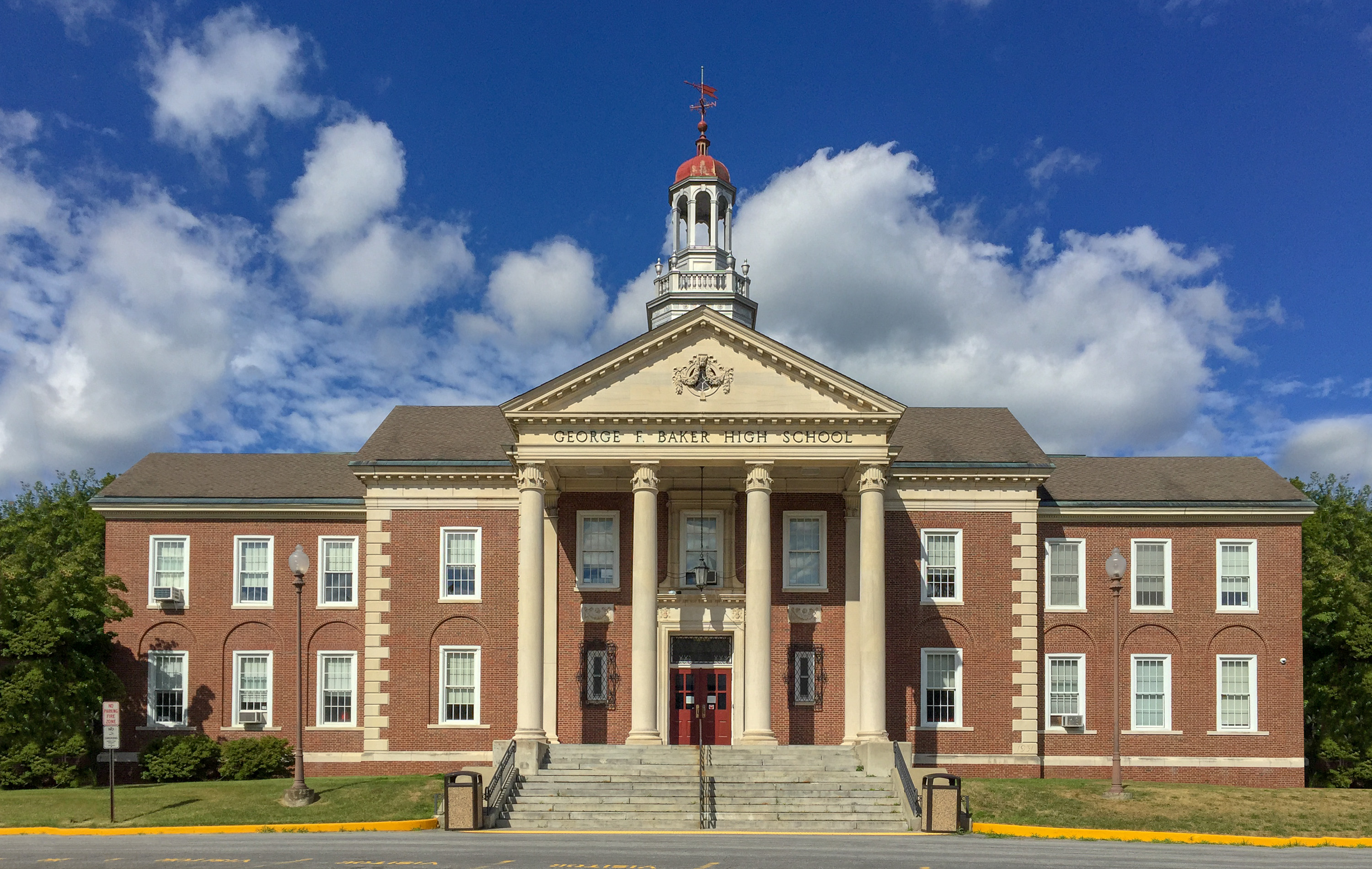

Location
- NY 17; Tuxedo, New York 10987; United States; 41°11′18″N 74°11′06″W

Information
- Funding type: Public school
- School district: Tuxedo Union Free School District
- Principal: Jared Kahmar
- Teaching staff: 21.65 (FTE)
- Grades: 6-12
- Enrollment: 96 (2024-2025)
- Average class size: 18
- Student to teacher ratio: 4.43
- Campus type: Suburban
- Colours: Red, white, and black
- Athletics: Men - soccer, basketball, wrestling, baseball; women - soccer, volleyball, softball, rowing
- Athletics conference: Orange County Interscholastic Athletic Association
- Mascot: Tuxedo Tornado
- Rival: S.S. Seward
- Communities served: Town of Tuxedo
- Feeder schools: George G. Mason School
- Website: www.tuxedoufsd.org/page/george-f-baker-high-school

George F. Baker High School is the public secondary school educating students in grades 6 through 12 in the Tuxedo Union Free School District. It is located on NY 17 in Tuxedo, New York, United States, near the gates of the village Tuxedo Park.

It educates students from the town of Tuxedo and the village of Tuxedo Park. Northern parts of Tuxedo however send their students to Monroe Woodbury.

== History ==
The school itself was a gift to the town by Tuxedo Park resident George Fisher Baker, an American banker and philanthropist. The school was built in 1931. Baker was known as the "American Dean of Banking" and was a cofounder of the First National Bank of the City of New York, which was the forerunner of today's Citibank N.A.. By the time of his death, Mr. Baker had amassed such a fortune in banking and railroads that he was estimated to be the third richest man in the United States, after Henry Ford and John D. Rockefeller. The George F. Baker High School building is modeled after the Harvard Business School's Baker Library and putting the buildings side by side gives a remarkable resemblance. Baker provided much of the initial funding for Harvard Business School with a 1924 grant of $5 million, for which Harvard gave him an honorary doctorate and named the library after him. The high school imposed a demanding all-Regents curriculum on students before the New York State Education Department began requiring it.

While the school was built in 1931, it was not a typical public high school, as it was equipped with large classrooms with extra tall ceilings, marble, granite and ornate decorations in the main auditorium and details such as chair rails in classrooms, all of which were not typical of a small public high school.

== Relationship with Greenwood Lake ==
The village of Greenwood Lake does not have a high school, and has depended on surrounding towns for high school education for over 90 years. The village had sent their students to George F. Baker for 30 years, but the agreement ended in 2015 leaving Tuxedo with the decision to either keep the school open, or tuition its students to surrounding towns. The Greenwood Lake School Board cited the cost per student at Tuxedo compared to lower bids from Warwick, Goshen and Chester as the primary reason for pulling students from the school. Greenwood Lake students who were already enrolled at George F. Baker High School were originally told that they would have an opportunity to stay at the school for the remainder of their schooling, but this was not the case.

In an attempt to retain the students, the Tuxedo Board of Education applied to become a STEM charter school which would allow students from Greenwood Lake as well as other neighboring towns to tuition into the school, but this was ultimately rejected by the New York Board of Regents. This led enrollment to drop by over 200 students leaving the full school around 80 students. It also created a $2.5 million shortfall in an operating budget without the Greenwood Lake tuition. At the end Greenwood Lake provided all options other than Tuxedo to their residents, and Tuxedo decided to keep the school open despite lower enrollment. It was determined that they would only save between 6–12% by tuitioning students to other schools such as Suffern, Ramsey, or Northern Highlands.

Also in 2015, the school's principal and superintendent resigned their positions.
