= Tuxedo Park School =

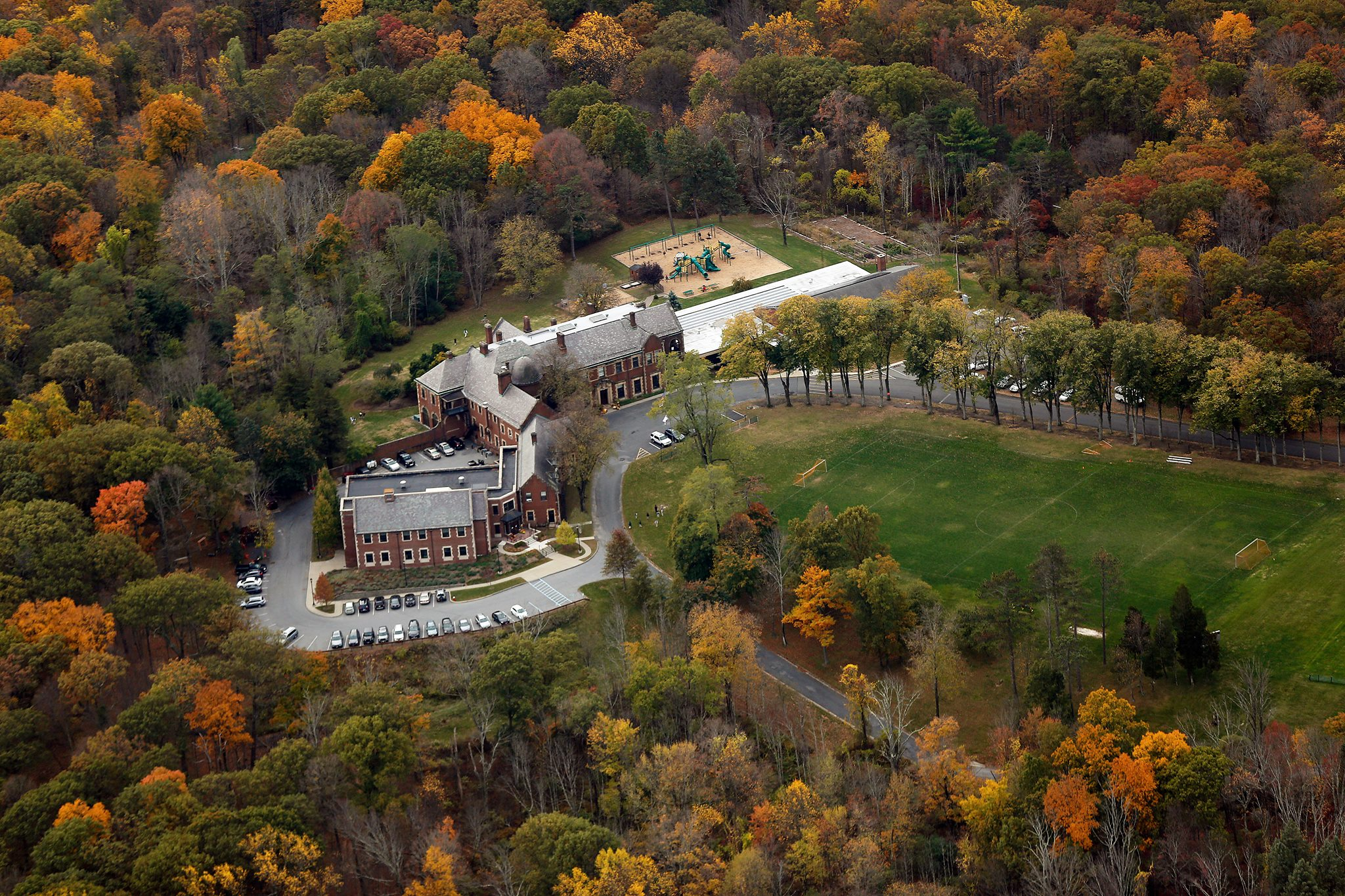

Location
- Mountain Farm Road., Tuxedo Park, NY 10987; United States; 41°12′32.2″N 74°12′56.5″W

Information
- Type: Private Coeducational Day School
- Motto: Be Kind. Be Fair. Be Responsible.
- Founded: 1900
- Head of school: Stuart Johnson
- Grades: Age 2 (Early Education) - 9th Grade
- Enrollment: 129
- Student to teacher ratio: 5:1
- Campus size: 17 Acres
- Colors: Green and Gold
- Mascot: Bear
- Accreditation: NYSAIS
- Publication: Green & Gold Gazette
- Newspaper: The Menuscript (seasonal newsletter)
- Tuition: $15,906 (Early Ed PT) - $47,177 (9th Grade)
- Website: tuxedoparkschool.org

Tuxedo Park School is an independent day school located in Tuxedo Park, New York, United States and serving the surrounding counties in both New York and New Jersey. The school enrolls students from age 2 in Early Education to the 9th grade (now known as the 'Freshman' year).

== History ==
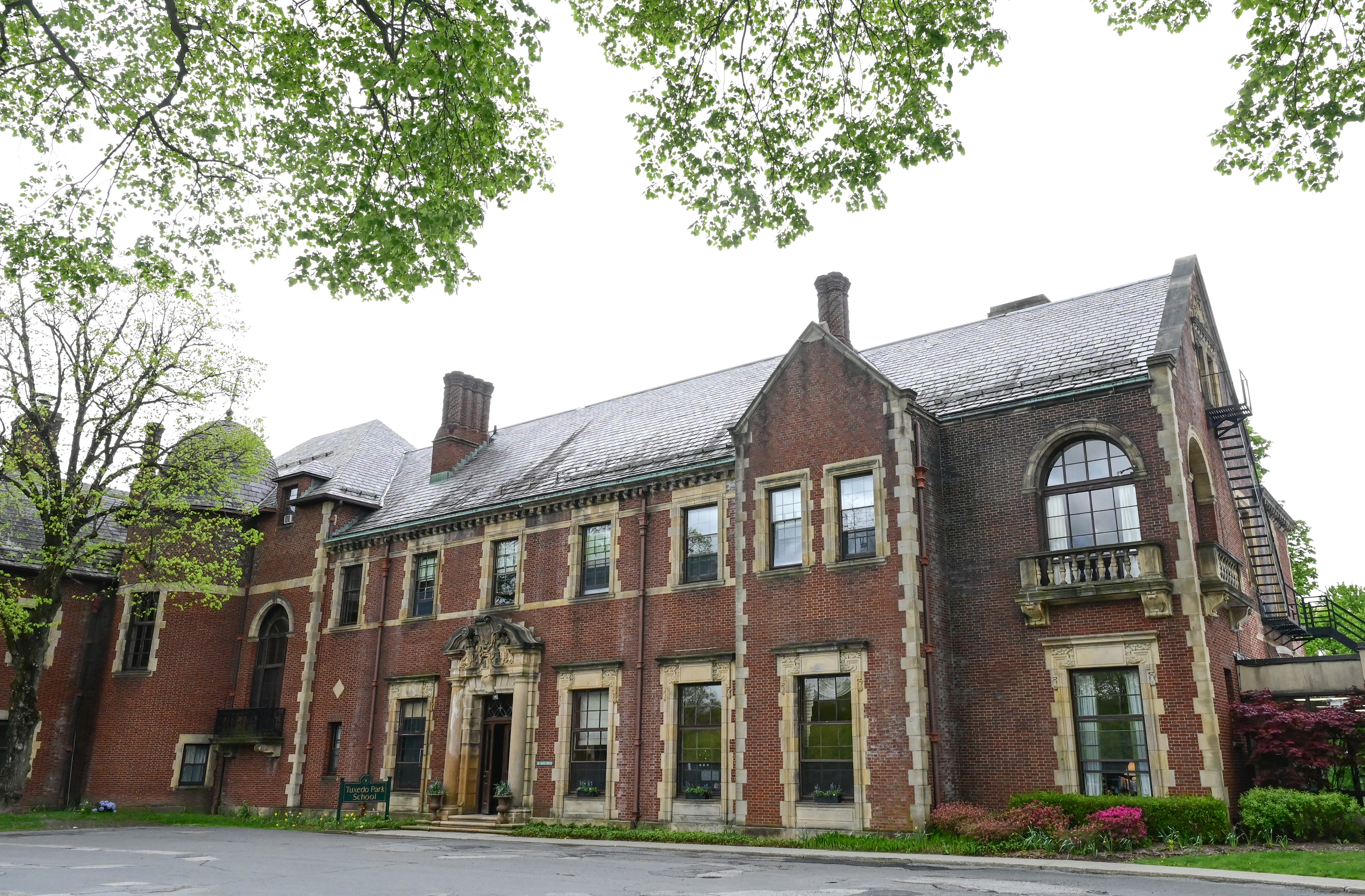
Front of Tuxedo Park School

Founded in 1900 for the purpose of educating children living in Tuxedo Park (having been founded in 1886 by Pierre Lorillard), the institution grew from a staff of two with 38 pupils from the outset to a current 125 students, sporting an average student-to-teacher ratio of 5:1.

Under the leadership of Anthony Barber in the early 1940s, the school received a New York State Charter and became an official not-for-profit institution.

Since the late 1950s the school has occupied a brick mansion house styled in the fashion of an English manor, formerly owned by John and Natalie Blair. The building is therefore referred to as 'Blairhame' in their memory.

== Academics ==
Small by design, the school maintains a low student-teacher ratio. The curriculum includes a blend of core academics, foreign language (beginning in Pre-K), fine and performing arts, athletics, community service, environmental stewardship, and character education.

== Athletics and Competition ==
All Upper school (Grades 7, 8, and 9) and 6th grade students are required to engage in an interscholastic sport while attending the school, options which include soccer, volleyball, tennis, squash, golf, both girls and boys lacrosse, basketball, and track and field, along with various other sport options, such as fitness or yoga.

Intra-scholastic competition is constructed around the annual Green and Gold competition. At the end of second grade, students are placed on a team, which competes each year in a multitude of activities, ranging from spelling bees to various artistic events, culminating in a grand athletic finale known as 'Field Day', often being the final determiner of a team's success.

== Heads of School ==
Head of School	Dates
Leon D. Bonnett	1900-1914
Arthur and Carolyn Eneboe	1914-1941
Anthony V. Barber	1941-1943
William W. Yardley	1943-1949
Phillip Potter	1949-1959
Samuel Hazard	1959-1962
John A. Shepard	1962-1980
Andrew J. McLaren	1980-1988
M. Patricia Bayliss	1988-1994
James Burger	1994-2011
Kathleen McNamera	2011-2015
Todd Stansbery	2015-2021
Stuart Johnson	2021–Present
