= Sterling Forest State Park =

New York park in the Ramapo Mountains

- Location within New York
- Type: State park
- Location: 116 Old Forge Road; Tuxedo, New York
- Coordinates: 41°11′56″N 74°15′24″W
- Area: 22,180 acres (89.8 km^{2})
- Created: 1998; 28 years ago
- Operator: Palisades Interstate Park Commission; New York State Office of Parks, Recreation and Historic Preservation
- Visitors: 266,944 (in 2014)
- Open: All year
- Website: Sterling Forest State Park

Sterling Forest State Park is a 22,180-acre (89.8 km^{2}) state park located in the Ramapo Mountains in Orange County, New York. Established in 1998, it is among the larger additions to the New York state park system in the last 50 years.

== History ==
Sterling Forest was originally part of a vast tract of land called Cheesecock that a group of English colonists bought from the Iroquois Indians in 1702. The land eventually came to belong to the Sterling Iron Works, which mined and shipped iron ore from a number of sites within the park. The last of the mines was closed in the 1920s. By the mid-1990s the Sterling Forest Corporation, a subsidiary of Trygg-Hansa, a Swedish insurance company, held title to 17,500 acres of the forest. The corporation was actively pursuing development of the property, proposing construction of 14,500 residential units and 7.4 million square feet of commercial and light industrial space. At risk was a largely undeveloped habitat of eastern hardwood forest, lakes, and streams in the nation's most densely populated metropolitan region.

Public advocacy for conservation of Sterling Forest had existed since the 1950s, but without success. By the 1990s, this advocacy was centered on the Public/Private Partnership to Save Sterling Forest, a coalition of twenty-nine New York and New Jersey nonprofit organizations chaired by Robert O. Binnewies, Executive Director of the Palisades Interstate Park Commission. The Public/Private Partnership worked for almost a decade to secure funding commitments from the federal government, the State of New Jersey, the State of New York, and private sources to achieve acquisition of most Sterling Forest Corporation holdings. In 1998, The Trust for Public Land and the Open Space Institute negotiated a purchase on behalf of the Palisades Interstate Park Commission of 15,805 acres of corporate holdings for $55 million. Governors George Pataki (NY) and Christine Todd Whitman (NJ) jointly announced that Sterling Forest State Park was established.

Among additional acquisitions subsequent to establishment, in November 1999, The Trust for Public Land and the Open Space Institute succeeded in purchasing 659 acres from New York University for inclusion in the park.

In December 2000, The Trust for Public Land and the Open Space Institute negoitiated for the purchase of 1,065 acres from the Sterling Forest Corporation to expand Sterling Forest State Park.

In 2005, The Trust for Public Land in conjunction with the State of New York Office of Parks, Recreation, and Historic Preservation purchased a 90-acre farm in Warwick, NY to add to the state park.

In 2006, the park was expanded yet again after a 575-acre (2.33 km^{2}) tract in the center of the forest known as Sterling Forge came on the market. Sterling Forest LLC developers planned to construct 107 luxury homes and an 18-hole golf course on the tract. Concerned members of the public rallied and were able to procure the tract for the state park. The final $13.5 million sale price was negotiated by The Trust for Public Land, funded through the State of New York Environmental Protection Fund. and private contributions.

In February 2021, Governor Andrew Cuomo announced the addition of another 112 acres to the state park, resulting from a partnership with the Orange County Land Trust.

These and other acquisitions have resulted in Palisades Interstate Park Commission holdings of 22,180 acres at Sterling Forest. Residential and commercial development no longer threaten negative impact to the natural ecosystem. Public outdoor recreation is the predominant use.

Funding for various acquisitions, beginning with the purchase in 1998 of 15,805 acres, have included the Lila Acheson and DeWitt Wallace Fund, the Doris Duke Charitable Foundation, the Victoria Foundation, the Trust for Public Land, the State of New York, the State of New Jersey, the Palisades Interstate Park Commission, the federal government, and contributions from private individuals.

== Park description and facilities ==
The park's forest habitat is important for the survival of several species, including timber rattlesnakes, black bear, fox, various raptors and songbirds, and many rare invertebrates and plants. The forest is embedded in a larger area of over 100,000 acres (400 km^{2}) of largely uninterrupted woodland that serves both as a wildlife corridor and as a watershed for nearby urban areas. The park contains a number of lakes and reservoirs including Sterling Lake and Blue Lake. Hunting, fishing, ice fishing, hiking and snowshoeing opportunities are available.

The park lies in the New York - New Jersey Highlands, a one-million-acre (4,000 km^{2}) stretch of natural habitat from the Hudson to the Delaware River that links the Abram S. Hewitt State Forest in New Jersey with Harriman State Park in New York. The park conserves a part of the Northeastern coastal forests ecoregion. It also protects the Appalachian Trail corridor, which crosses the northern portion of Sterling Forest. The park is administered by the Palisades Interstate Park Commission. The Appalachian Trail in Sterling Forest is maintained by the New York - New Jersey Trail Conference.

The park includes the Frank R. Lautenberg Visitor Center, which offers exhibits about the local environment and overlooks Sterling Lake. The Sterling Mountain Fire Observation Tower and Observer's Cabin is located on Sterling Mountain.

A New York State hunting license and a Sterling Forest State Park hunting permit are required to hunt in the park, which is only permitted during deer and turkey season. Some areas are closed to hunting.

== See also ==
- List of New York state parks
