= Sterling Mountain Fire Observation Tower and Observer's Cabin =

- U.S. National Register of Historic Places
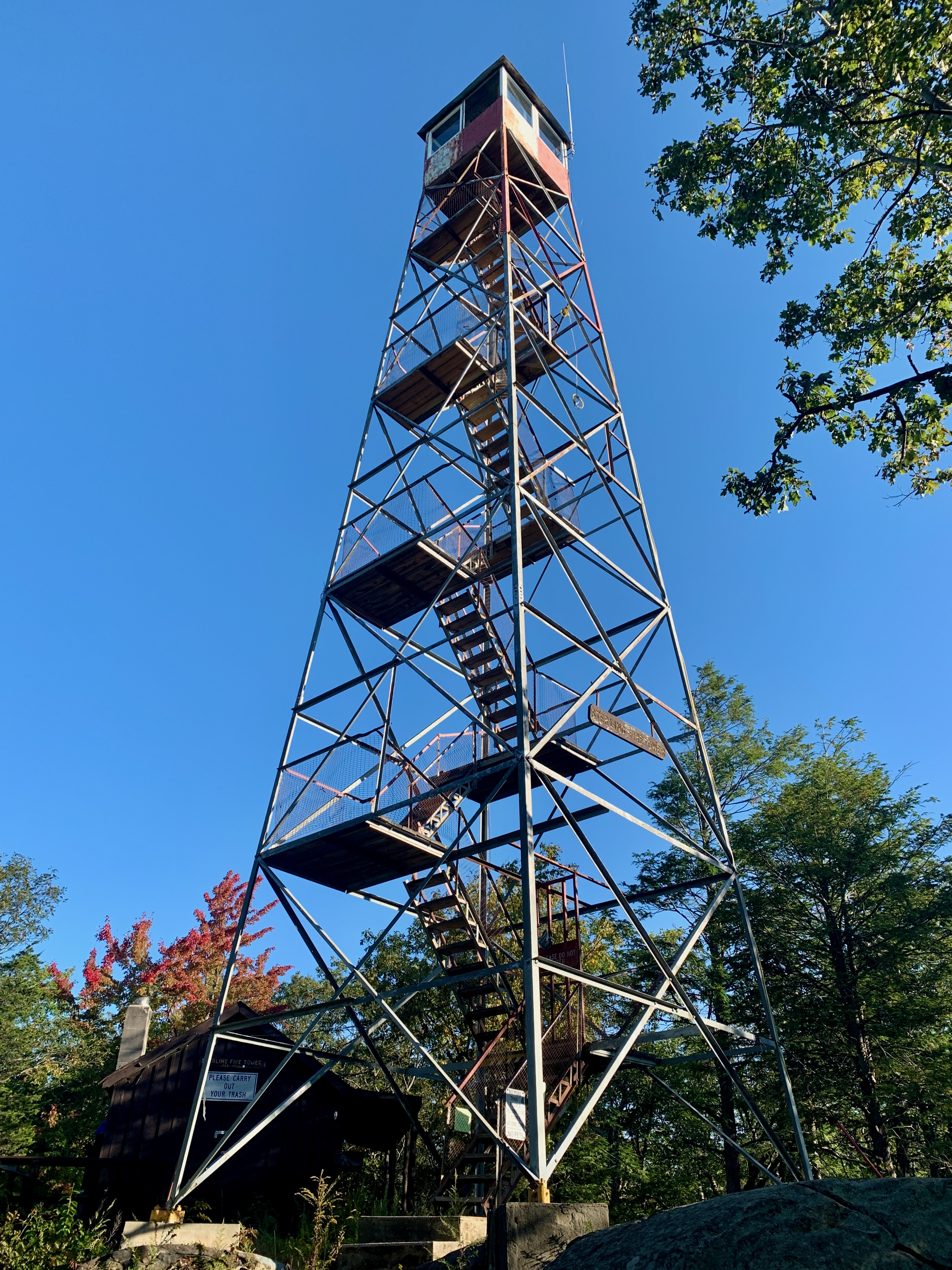

- Location within New York Location within the United States
- Nearest city: Greenwood Lake, New York
- Coordinates: 41°11′42″N 74°16′44″W
- Area: less than one acre
- Built: 1922
- Architect: Aermotor Corporation
- NRHP reference No.: 06000644
- Added to NRHP: July 28, 2006

The Sterling Mountain Fire Observation Tower and Observer's Cabin is a historic fire observation station located on Sterling Mountain in Sterling Forest State Park at Greenwood Lake in Orange County, New York. Located at an elevation of 1,320 ft (400 m), the station includes a 60-foot-tall (18 m), steel-frame lookout tower erected in 1922 and an observer's cabin built about 1934. The tower is a prefabricated structure built by the Aermotor Corporation and provided a front line of defense in preserving the Ramapo Mountains from the hazards of forest fires. The observer's cabin is of light frame construction, sheathed with board and batten siding stained brown.

In 1968 an access road was constructed to facilitate repairs, with both the tower and cabin being upgraded that same year. The station became a volunteer-run reserve lookout in 1989 when New York State ended its fire observation program.

It was added to the National Register of Historic Places in 2006.

== See also ==
- National Register of Historic Places listings in Orange County, New York
