= Sterling Iron Works =

Steel and iron manufacturer in New York, US

Coordinates: 41°11.856′N 74°15.609′W

The Sterling Iron Works owned by Peter Townsend was one of the first steel and iron manufacturers in the Thirteen Colonies and the first steel producer in the Province of New York. The company was most famous for forging the Hudson River Chain that kept the British Navy from sailing up the Hudson during the American Revolution, and served to protect the strategically important fort at West Point. The works were operational from 1761 to 1842.

== Initial ore discovery ==
In 1750 the first discovery was made of a rich superficial deposit of iron ore at the south end of Sterling Mountain, in the town of Monroe, New York. In the following year, Ward & Colton erected at the outlet of mine and Sterling Pond, in the extreme southern part of Warwick, near the Monroe line, a charcoal blast-furnace, which was the first in Warwick. These works were called the Sterling Iron-works, honoring General William Alexander known as Lord Stirling, the owner of the land, and later an officer in the Revolutionary army. They were built for the manufacture of anchors, including for the United States frigate, USS Constitution. A second Sterling furnace was built in 1777.

== Additional mines opened ==
Several other veins of magnetic ore were later opened in the vicinity of the Sterling mine, which itself covered about 30 acres (120,000 m^{2}). The Forest of Dean mine, a very extensive bed six miles (10 km) west-northwest of Fort Montgomery, as early as 1756 supplied a furnace, and was abandoned twenty-one years later. The vein is over 30 feet (9.1 m) thick and 150 feet (46 m) broad, and made good cold short iron.

The Long Mine, belonging to the Townsends, was discovered in 1761 by David Jones and supplied about 500 tons of ore annually to the Sterling Works over the next 70–80 years for an aggregate production of about 140,000 tons. It was the only mine at which systematic mining was attempted in that time, and was worked to the depth of 170 feet (52 m) on a single vein 6 feet (1.8 m) thick. The ore yielded 62 per cent, of strong tough metal, from which cannon, muskets, wire, steel, fine malleable iron, and harness-buckles were made.

The Mountain Mine, half a mile southwest of Long Mine, was found in 1758 by a hunter, in consequence of a tree having been blown up by the roots. The Iron from this mine was remarkable for its strength and fine polish, and was in consequence chiefly exported to England to be tinned.

== First metal produced in New York ==
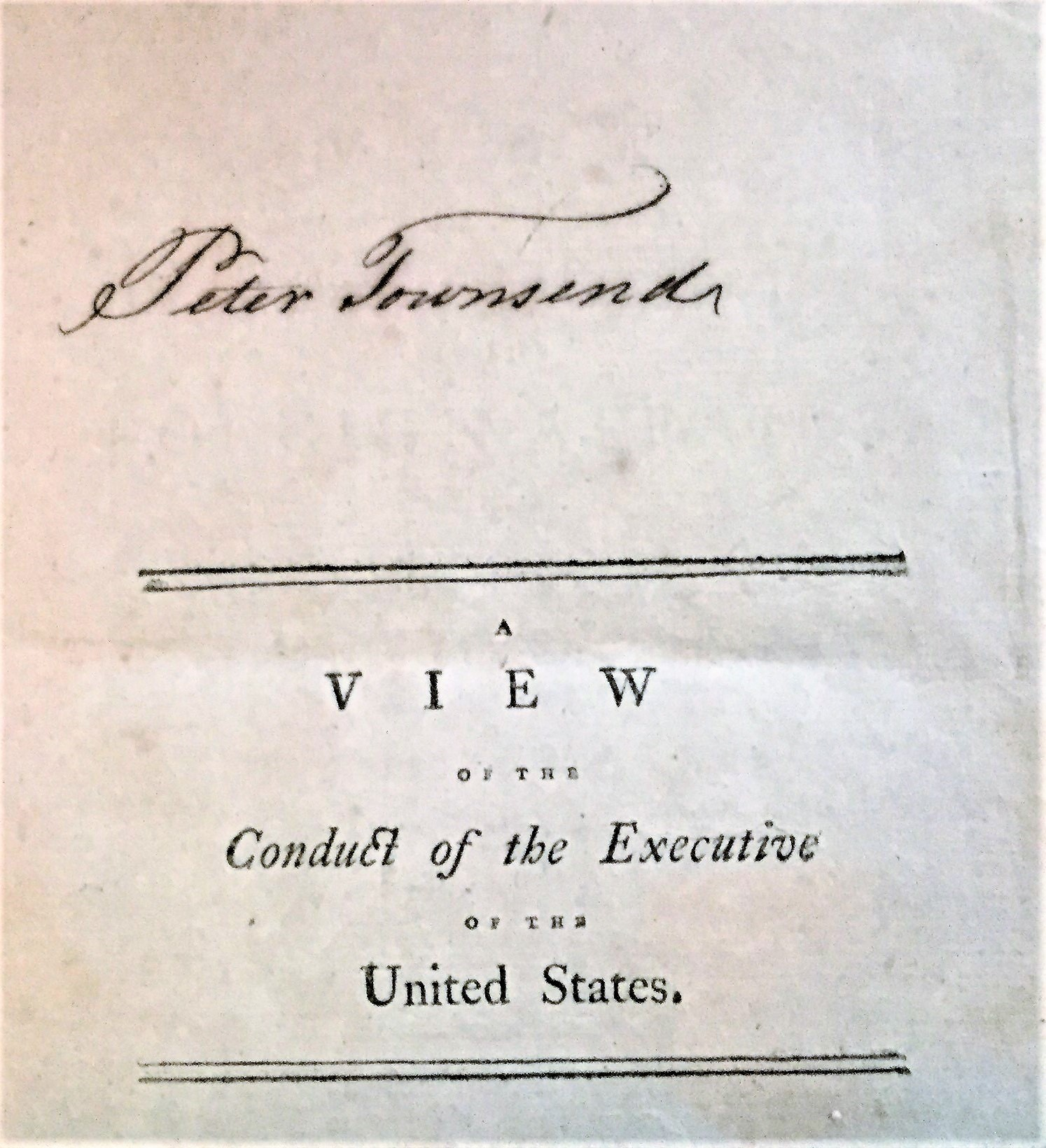
Autograph of Peter Townsend, noted in the American Revolution, owner of Sterling Iron Works

Mr. Peter Townsend, who became the owner of Sterling Iron before the Revolutionary War, made iron anchors in 1773, and in 1776 produced the first steel in New York, at first from pig and afterward from bar iron. The first blister steel made in the State was made by his son, Peter Townsend Jr., in 1810, from ore of the Long Mine on the Sterling estate. In the manufacture of edge-tools it was considered equal to the famous Dannemora mine Swedish Iron.

The first cannon made in the State were cast at Sterling for the government, in 1816. They were from 6 to 32-pounders.

== The Hudson River Chain ==
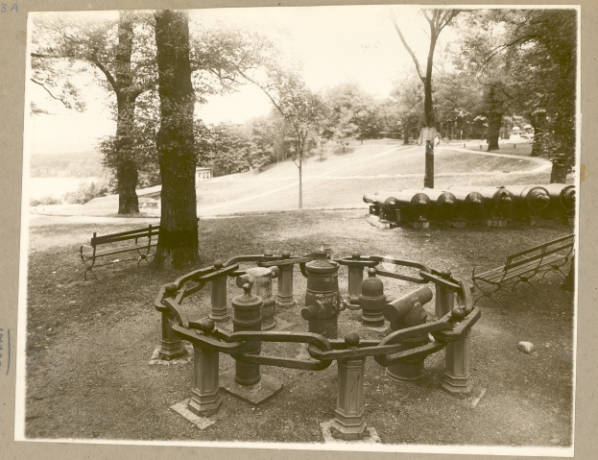
The Great Chain forged at Stirling Iron Works by Peter Townsend

At the close of 1779, West Point was the strongest military post in America. In addition to the batteries that stood menacingly upon the hill tops, the river was obstructed by an enormous defensive iron chain. The iron of which this chain was constructed was wrought from ore of equal parts, from the Stirling and Long Mines, in Orange county. The chain was manufactured at the Stirling Iron Works about 25 miles (40 km) from West Point. The general superintendent of the work, as engineer, was Captain Thomas Machin, who afterward assisted in the engineering operations at the siege of Yorktown. The project took place under the supervision of Colonel Timothy Pickering.

The chain was completed in the middle of April, 1778, and on 1 May it was stretched across the river and secured. It weighed 186 tons, and was made and delivered in six weeks. This chain was forged at Stirling, hauled piece by piece to New Windsor, and put together at the military smithy of Capt. Machin. It was then floated down the Hudson as a whole, and placed in position. It remained unbroken during the war although others at Fort Montgomery and on the lake above were broken by the British. Links of these chains, weighing 140 lb (64 kg). each, are preserved at the Military Academy at West Point.

In front of this chain was a heavy boom of logs. Each winter the chain and boom were un-moored, taken up to the beach, in the cove now crossed by the railroad tracks, and piled up out of reach of the moving ice until ready to be replaced in the spring.

The chain was instrumental in the discovery of Benedict Arnold, when Peter Townsend's cousin, Sally Townsend, whose brother Robert was a member of Gen George Washington's Culper Ring of spies, allegedly intercepted information at the family home in Oyster Bay, Long Island which occupied by British officers. The intercepted message from Arnold indicated that he had weakened the chain and contained instructions on how the Royal Navy could breach its defenses and take the fort at West Point. When he realized he had been discovered, Arnold escaped to the British and the chain remained intact throughout the war.

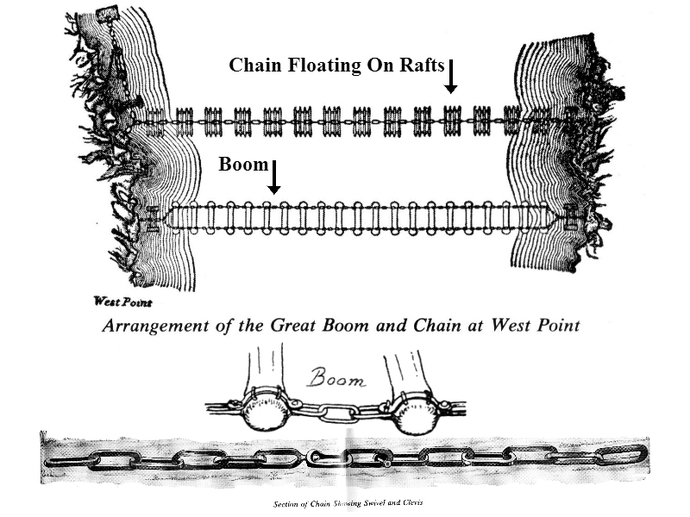
Iron Chain and Boom at West Point

=== Origin of boom placed in front of the Hudson River Chain ===
Chaining The Hudson River In the summer of 1777, the Long Pond Iron Works in Ringwood, New Jersey manufactured iron for a boom intended to be installed in front of Fort Montgomery (Bear Mountain) chain. Over 30 tons of chain links and components were carried by ox cart from Ringwood over the Ramapo Mountains to the Hudson River. Unfortunately for the Americans, the British captured the fort and carried away the chain before the boom could be properly installed.

After the capture of Fort Montgomery, the Ringwood iron was taken to West Point and used to make the boom placed in front of the West Point chain, which was forged at the Sterling Iron Works and placed across the river in 1778.

- Note: The great chain that stretches across the front lawn of Ringwood Manor is not the one of Revolutionary War fame; it was made later and sold to Abram S. Hewitt. Even though Mr. Hewitt probably realized they were a forgery, he kept the links anyway. Regardless, it does give a good idea of what the original huge iron obstacle was like.
- Note: In 1967 Margaret Mead with students from Ridgewood schools conducted a week long archaeological dig at the Long Pond Furnace site uncovering the Revolutionary Furnace.
