= St. Mary's-in-Tuxedo Episcopal Church =

Church in Tuxedo, New York

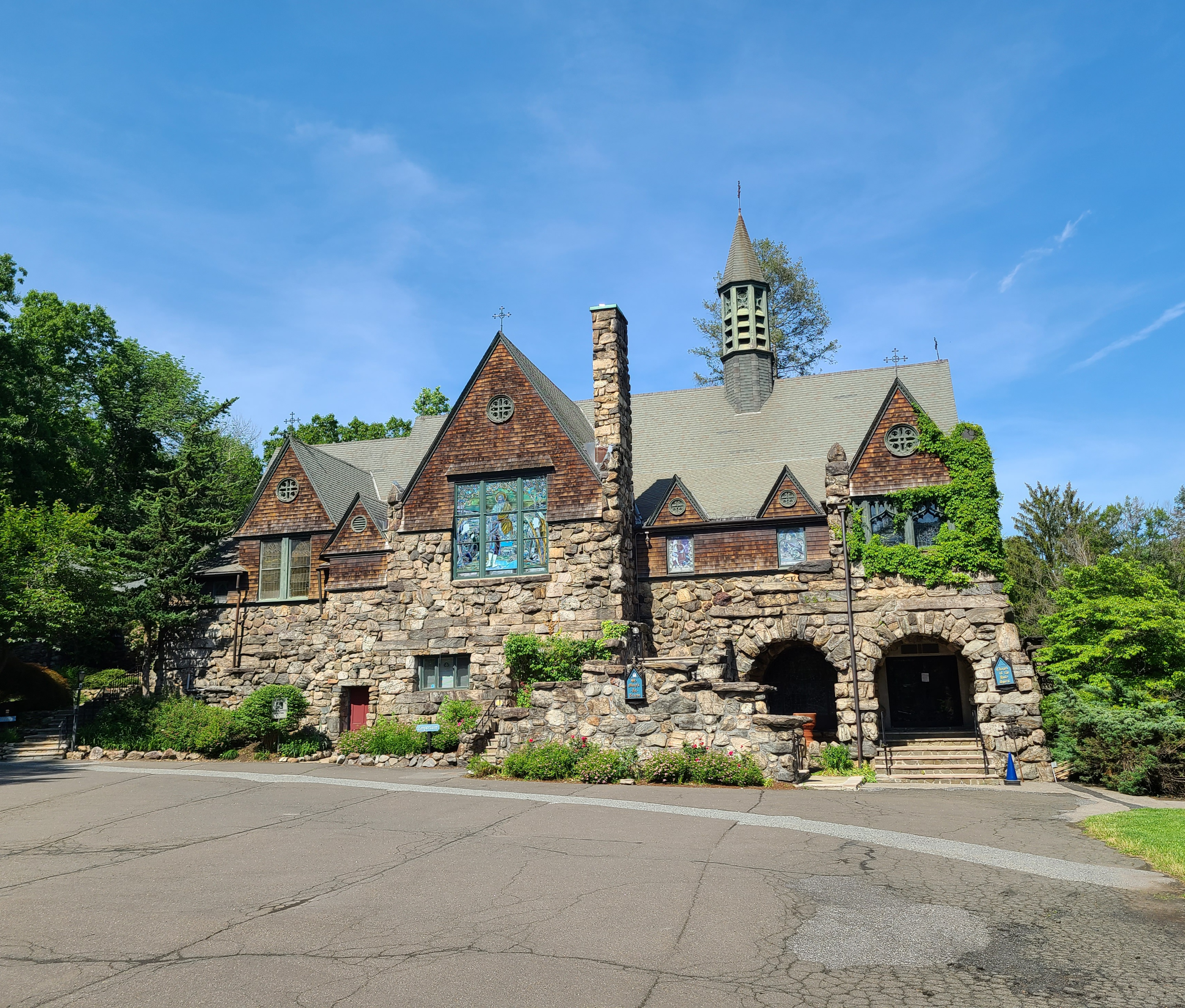
- St. Mary's-in-Tuxedo Episcopal Church
- 41°11′47″N 74°11′11″W
- Location: 10 Fox Hill Road, Tuxedo Park, New York
- Country: United States
- Denomination: Episcopal
- Website: www.stmtux.org

History
- Founded: 1887; 139 years ago
- Dedication: Saint Mary
- Consecrated: 1888

Architecture
- Functional status: Active
- Architect: William Appleton Potter
- Architectural type: Shingle style

Specifications
- Capacity: 300
- Materials: Native stone, shingles

Administration
- Province: Province II
- Diocese: New York

Clergy
- Rector: The Rev. Richard James Robÿn

St. Mary's-in-Tuxedo Episcopal Church, otherwise simply referred to as St. Mary's-in-Tuxedo, is an active Episcopal church in Tuxedo, New York, located within the historic village of Tuxedo Park.

Constructed in 1888 according to designs by architect William Appleton Potter, the Shingle style community church was the result of efforts to establish a permanent place of worship for Tuxedo's predominantly Episcopalian residents. The church's interior features the work of architect Bertram Goodhue and sculptor Lee Lawrie, which accompanies the many examples of late 19th- and early 20th-century stained glass produced by prominent artists, including Louis Comfort Tiffany and John La Farge. Later additions to the wider campus include designs by Richard Howland Hunt and James Brown Lord.

Many high society weddings have taken place at St. Mary's over the years, including that of Angier B. Duke to Priscilla Avenal St. George in 1937. Earlier services were attended by financier J. P. Morgan and on two occasions by future President Franklin Delano Roosevelt. The lives of several people associated with Tuxedo Park are memorialized within the church, while the St. Mary's cemetery is the final resting place for several noted figures of the American Gilded Age.

== History ==
=== Establishment ===
The brother-in-law of Tuxedo Park founder Pierre Lorillard IV, Henry Isaac Barbey, offered to arrange for the construction of a village church in 1887. Previously the community had used both a local public schoolhouse—at the instigation of Tuxedo Park resident Robert Fulton Cutting—and later a temporary chapel designed by James Brown Lord for Episcopal services, the first of which took place in Tuxedo on July 18, 1886. Following its construction St. Mary's was consecrated on October 14, 1888, by architect William A. Potter's brother, Bishop of the Episcopal Diocese of New York Henry Codman Potter; the church was dedicated to Saint Mary. Founding vestry members included Grenville Kane, co-founder of the Park and a director of Northern Pacific Railway and the New York Public Library, James Brown Potter, the Brown Brothers merchant banker married to actress Cora Urquhart who reputedly introduced the tuxedo to America, and James L. Breese, an accomplished amateur photographer and owner of "The Orchard".

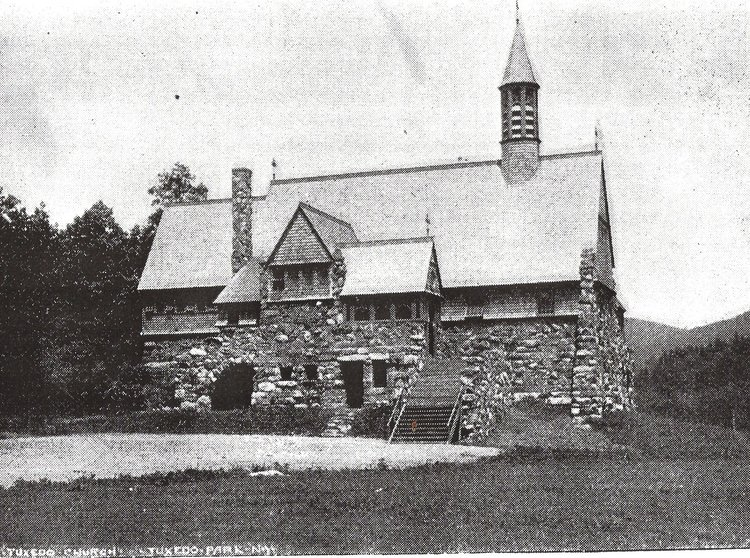
Exterior view sometime before 1897

=== Early history ===
St. Mary's soon became an established institution within the wider Tuxedo community. Pew rent records indicate the range of Tuxedo families who were involved in church life, including Frelinghuysens, Lorillards, Cuttings and Mortimers. Active by the 1890s, the St. Mary's Sunday school held at least one of its annual picnics on the grounds of William Waldorf Astor's Tuxedo Park estate. When the Reverend George Merrill returned to Tuxedo from Newport after his marriage to Ms. Pauline Dresser in December 1897, his daughter relayed that "the entire village met them at the train with great flaming lanterns and led them to the church through the snow singing 'Onward Christian Soldiers'." When Tuxedo's recently established Our Lady of Mount Carmel Roman Catholic church was completely destroyed by fire on July 4, 1899, the Rev. Merrill invited the affected congregation to worship in the St. Mary's Sunday School room while the new Heins & LaFarge-designed building was being constructed.

Tuxedo resident and author George M. Rushmore offers a vignette of the Sunday procession to St. Mary's during the 1890s in The World with a Fence Around It: Tuxedo Park – The Early Days (1957):

On Sundays in season a long and picturesque procession of vehicles used to wind down to the Episcopal Church of St. Mary's. The Cuttings, the Alexanders, and the Gibsons, had yellow basket victorias with big fawn-colored parasol tops suspended over the heads of the family by curved metal rods. Beside the coachman sat a small groom or tiger, with folded arms, attired in a livery coat and tight doeskin breeches, a cockaded high hat on his head, and a serious expression on his face. The Munroes usually went packed in a big blue and black wagonette, or sometimes in a dark blue and black surrey. There were runabouts, landaus, black victorias and two-seater phaetons in which the groom sat behind on a small rumble seat, and in addition to all these vehicles there were two club stages. At the Deer Pen Hill, the last leg of the journey, soft-eyed deer would line up alongside the fence that bounded their home – silent spectators of the weekly parade.

Tuxedo women supported St. Mary's in a variety of ways, becoming members of church-affiliated committees and guilds. Examples include Clemence Smith Bryce, wife of Nicholas Fish II, who provided a musical reception at the parish house opening reception in 1901, and Josephine Lee, wife of architect Bruce Price, who was a member of the Sewing School Committee. The St. Mary's Guild was founded by a number of Tuxedo women in June 1891, tasked with supervising several church organizations. A significant gift of $10,000 was provided by financier Robert Fulton Cutting in 1919, ensuring the Guild's financial stability during the Great Depression.

Several sources attest to the extensive decorations that accompanied the era's weddings at St. Mary's. Parts of the church's nave and sanctuary, including the aisles, pews, altar and columns, were decorated with a wide variety of seasonal and imported foliage; examples include palms, lilies, peonies, holly, roses, dogwood, ferns, fruit blossoms, dahlias, gladioluses, snapdragons, forsythia and syringa. Arches were covered with woodland foliage and laurel, while the rafters were filled with branches of balsam. On one occasion a wedding bell formed from white roses was hung from a central arch in the nave. A wedding gown first worn in 1768 and later worn by Julia Thorne at her 1970 marriage to John Kerry was worn by Julia Loomis Thorne, Alfred Lee Loomis's sister, at her St. Mary's wedding in 1911. The gown was once described by The New York Times as being "perhaps the most notable wedding gown in existence in this country".

St. Mary's for many years operated a chapel in neighboring Sloatsburg, New York, a ministry which began when the Rev. Merrill starting conducting services in the Sloatsburg town hall in 1900. By 1904 land was deeded to St. Mary's to construct a chapel, consecrated as "St. Francis" that autumn. An advisory board was established for St. Francis' Chapel in the 1930s and was shared for a time with the nearby St. Elizabeth's Memorial Chapel in the Eagle Valley hamlet of Tuxedo. St. Mary's ties with St. Francis ended in 1953 when the latter became a diocesan mission. The chapel subsequently closed in 1974.

Historical sources relate that St. Mary's supported itself and its activities through its endowment, annual contributions and pew rentals, which in 1926 were set at $100 per pew. During the 1920s the church continued to play a major role in the community, serving as the initial meeting place for local chapters of the American Legion, Freemasons, and Order of the Eastern Star.

A single-manual, 11-stop Roosevelt organ (Opus 399) was built for the church in 1888. Only by 1919 was St. Mary's able to secure a permanent organist, Fred Bentley, who maintained this position until his death in 1960. Another early St. Mary's organist was Frank H. Mather, a graduate of the Royal Academy and Royal College of Music in London. Tragedy struck the parish when four-time U.S. singles championship tennis player and Tuxedo resident Robert Wrenn struck and killed St. Mary's organist and choirmaster Herbert George Loveday after losing control of his vehicle on May 3, 1914. Charges of manslaughter against Wrenn were subsequently dropped.

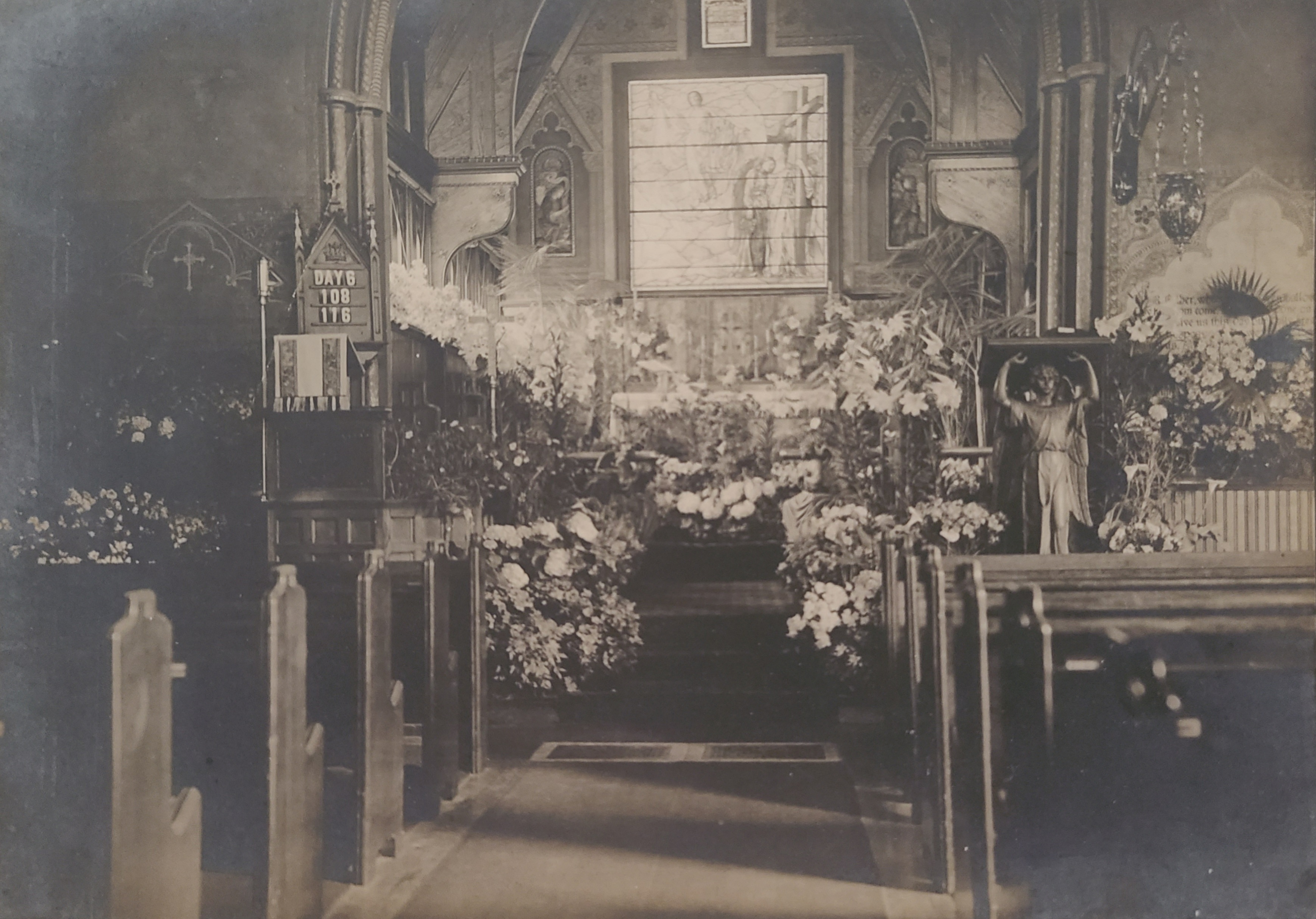
Pre-1900 image of the sanctuary prior to the 1922 redesign, featuring the carved oak lectern given by Herbert C. Pell Sr.

=== Post-Depression era ===
The Wall Street Crash of 1929 took a toll on parish life and the church's finances, as the congregation and the pew rents it provided reduced in size. Several parishioners soon defected to nearby St. Elizabeth's in Eagle Valley, having found themselves unaccustomed to the high church style of the new rector, the Reverend Leon Cartmell. The "lean years" soon drew to a close however with the end of World War II, with the relocation of young families to the suburbs rejuvenating a stagnated church life. The Reverend Fenimore Cooper made further efforts to encourage participation in church life, forming several guilds for ushers, acolytes and lay readers.

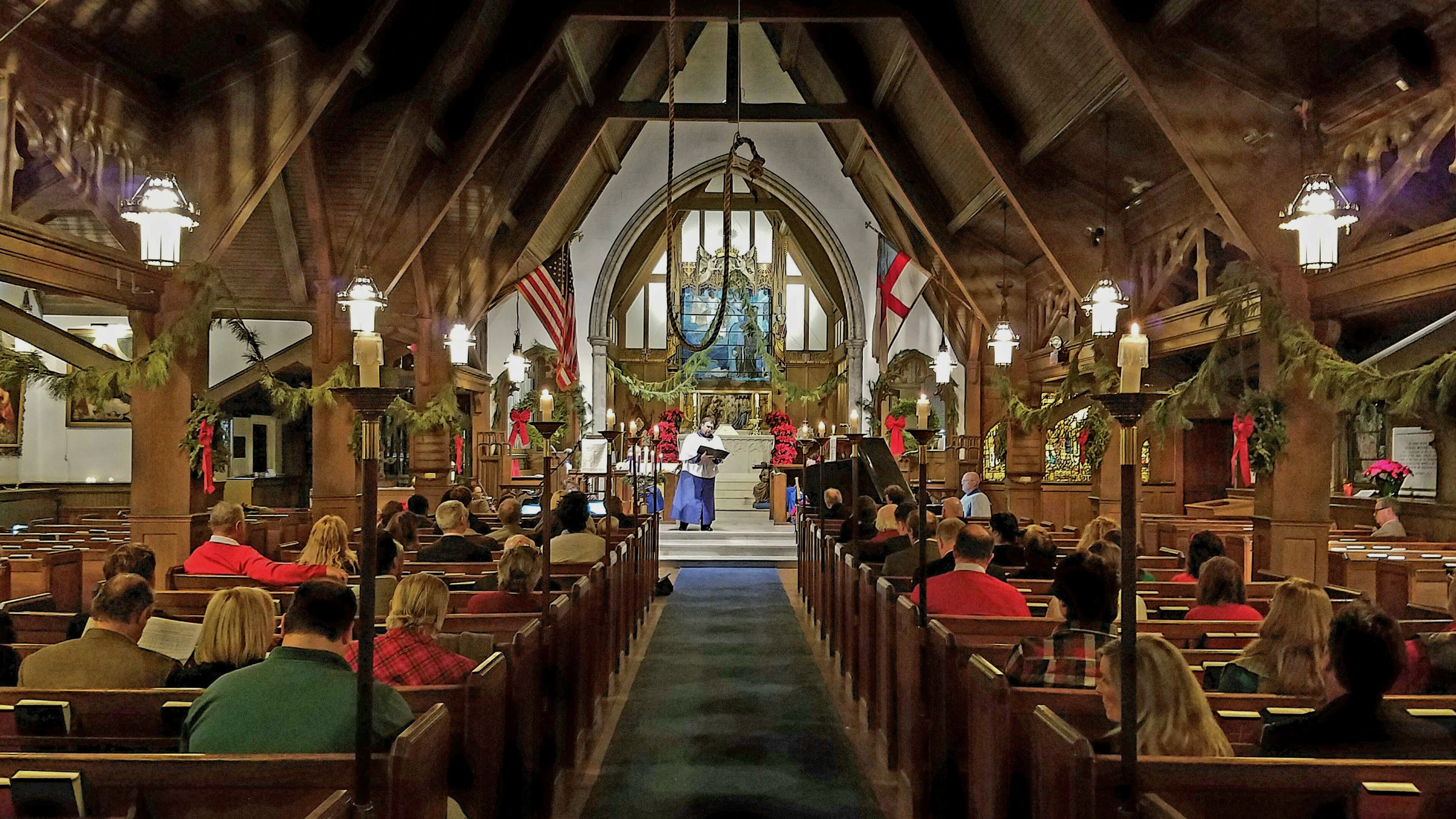
The nave during the annual Christmas Eve service, showing the oak ceilings, trusses and pews

Although not formally affiliated with St. Mary's, the New York diocese established a diocesan conference center named after Bishop Donegan in Tuxedo Park in 1957. St. Mary's was occasionally represented at conferences held at the center. Father Cooper was a member of the committee tasked with renovating the center, which at one point housed the Tuxedo Park School. The T. Henry Randall-designed estate was the former residence of Henry W. Poor and Henry Morgan Tilford, and was described by the New York Times as "one of the finest country residences in America". The American Carpatho-Russian Orthodox Diocese of North America purchased the home from the Episcopal church in 1978 to establish a monastic community.

The financial troubles that had plagued the parish since the Depression had eased by the 1960s, a reversal of fortunes attributed to successful endowment investing and a growing local population. Over several years until its completion in 1962, Francis Ormond French, son of Manhattan Trust banker Amos Tuck French, helped to raise the $60,000 needed to construct the St. Mary's education building. French died the very morning of the dedication ceremony held on Trinity Sunday, 1962 for the building that to this day bears his name. Henry Mortimer financed parish house and undercroft renovations in 1971, dedicating these revisions alongside his siblings—including John Jay Mortimer and Stanley Grafton Mortimer—to his parents. By 1973 a new 3-manual, 35-stop Austin organ (Opus 2557) was installed at St. Mary's; the organist for the Church of the Heavenly Rest in New York City, Mr. Charles D. Walker, was invited to play a special inaugural concert. The serial entrepreneur and Tuxedo Park resident Hazard Reeves was inspired to found what was "said to be the world's first computerized multi-catalogue shopping system", Catalogia, after struggling to find a bell chime timing device for St. Mary's.

One-time Tuxedo resident Jimmy Webb wrote a cantata for a children's choir and small orchestra for St. Mary's, first performed in December 1983. An expanded version was later performed by Art Garfunkel and Amy Grant for the 1986 album The Animals' Christmas. Other noteworthy musical events held at St. Mary's include a 1985–1986 concert series that featured a performance by clarinetist Gervase de Peyer, and a 1993 concert held in collaboration with the Edvard Grieg Society of New York featuring the soprano Bodil Arnesen.

In 1974, Bishop of New York Paul Moore Jr. visited St. Mary's to install board members for a local conference of Episcopal churches known as the Southern Orange Community. Bishop Moore would return to the parish several years later to lead a special service celebrating the centennial of the founding of St. Mary's, held on October 16, 1988.

Recent years have seen efforts to restore several of the church's stained glass windows and the establishment of a building preservation fund to aid repairs and ongoing maintenance. A report commissioned by the church in 2019 identified several critical areas in need of repair in both the church and the nearby rectory.

=== Notable people ===
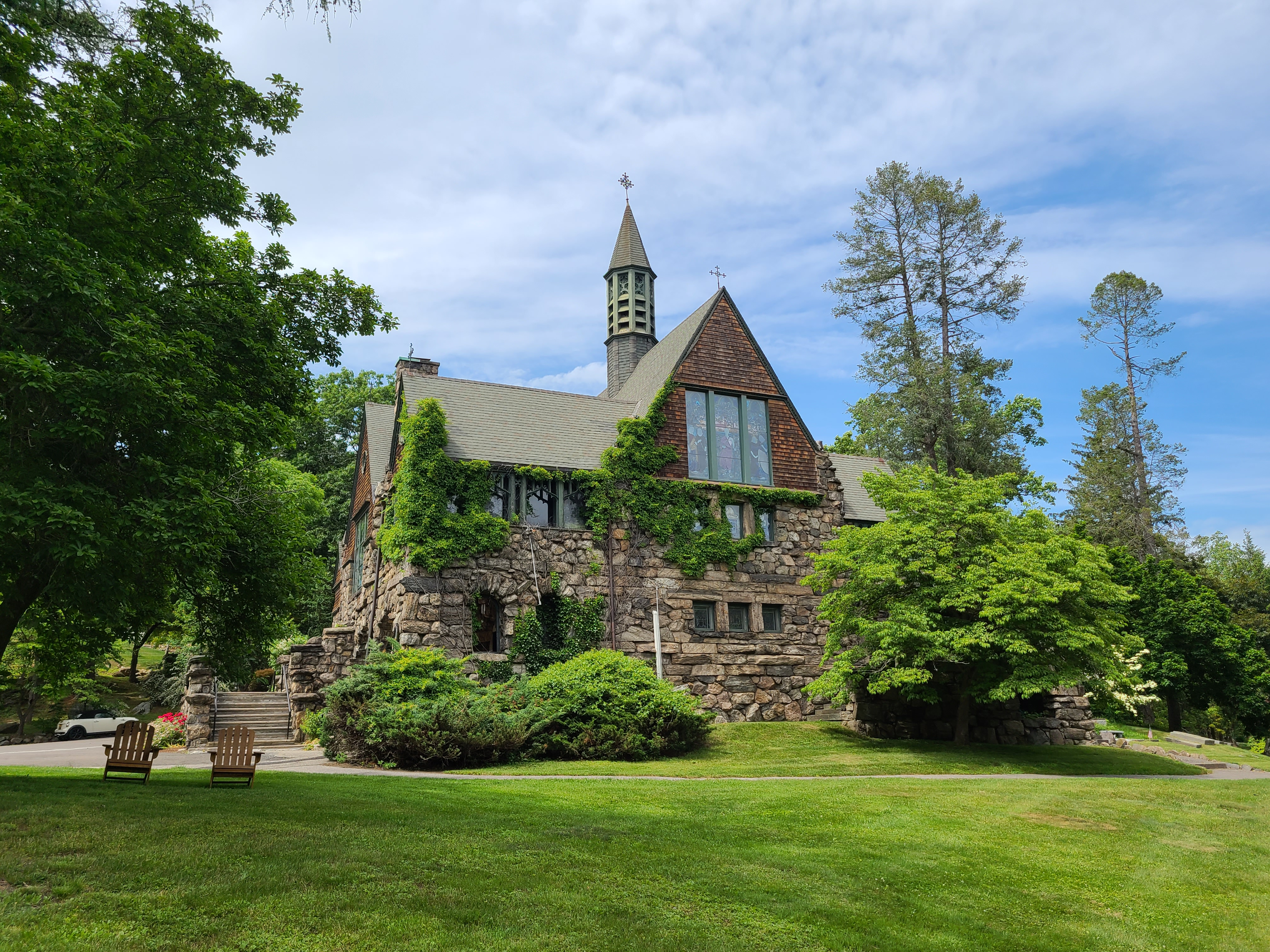
View of St. Mary's from the churchyard

Several notable figures are known to have attended services at St. Mary's. A young Franklin Delano Roosevelt signed his name in the parish register while attending a baptismal ceremony on June 9, 1896, serving as a godfather for his cousin and Tuxedo Park resident Sara Roosevelt Collier. Roosevelt was to later return to St. Mary's as an usher in the marriage of Muriel Delano Robbins to Cyril Martineau on June 1, 1907. Future US Representative and Governor-General of the Philippines Francis Burton Harrison married Mary Crocker, daughter of Charles Frederick Crocker, at St. Mary's in 1900. Author Mark Twain attended the 1906 wedding of Grenville Kane's eldest daughter, Sybil Kane, to the architect A. Stewart Walker. Twain is described as being a friend of the then-rector of St. Mary's the Reverend William Fitz-Simon, with the latter writing the former soliciting advice on the subject of marriage in 1908. Banker J. P. Morgan attended Fitz-Simon's wedding in June that same year, leading the bride, his niece Ursula Morgan, up the St. Mary's aisle. The then-Superintendent of the United States Military Academy Douglas MacArthur was invited to speak at two Memorial Day services held on the church lawn in the early 1920s, around the same time that he met his future wife Louise Cromwell Brooks at a party in Tuxedo. The then-Bishop of Rhode Island James DeWolf Perry presided over the wedding of Louise King and Kenneth Shaw Safe at St. Mary's on April 24, 1926; guests included Henry Francis du Pont and Frederic Augustus Juilliard.

High-profile and noteworthy services continued to take place at St. Mary's in the post-Depression era. The once-youngest American ambassador in history and Chief of Protocol of the United States Angier B. Duke was married to Priscilla Avenal St. George at a St. Mary's ceremony on January 2, 1937; also in attendance was the banker and Tuxedo resident Charles E. Mitchell. Later that same month, a number of notables were present at the funeral for New York State Special Sessions Judge Frederic Kernochan, including Fiorello La Guardia, Thomas E. Dewey and President Franklin D. Roosevelt's son, James Roosevelt. Funeral services for Adele S. Colgate, noted dog show judge, collector of Currier and Ives prints, and heir to the Colgate-Palmolive fortune, were held at St. Mary's on May 5, 1962. The Duke of Windsor and former King Edward VIII of England, along with his wife, Duchess of Windsor Wallis Simpson, attended a baptism at St. Mary's for one of the Duchess's godchildren in May 1969.

=== List of rectors ===
- The Rev. Vaughn Colston (1888-1891)
- The Rev. W. McCarthy Windsor (1892-1894)
- The Rev. George G. Merrill (1894-1903)
- The Rev. William Fitz-Simon (1903-1911)
- The Rev. Malbone Burkhead (1911-1912)
- The Rev. Robert S. W. Wood (1912-1937)
- The Rev. Leon E. Cartmell (1937-1952)
- The Rev. Fenimore E. Cooper (1953-1969)
- The Rev. James R. Leo (1969-1979)
- The Rev. Dr. Edwin H. Cromey (1980-2006)
- The Rev. Elizabeth S. McWhorter (2007-2015)
- The Rev. Richard J. Robÿn (2017–Present)

The Rev. Dana Colley Corsello, who as of January 2025 serves as Canon Vicar at the Washington National Cathedral, previously served St. Mary's as associate rector.

== Architecture ==
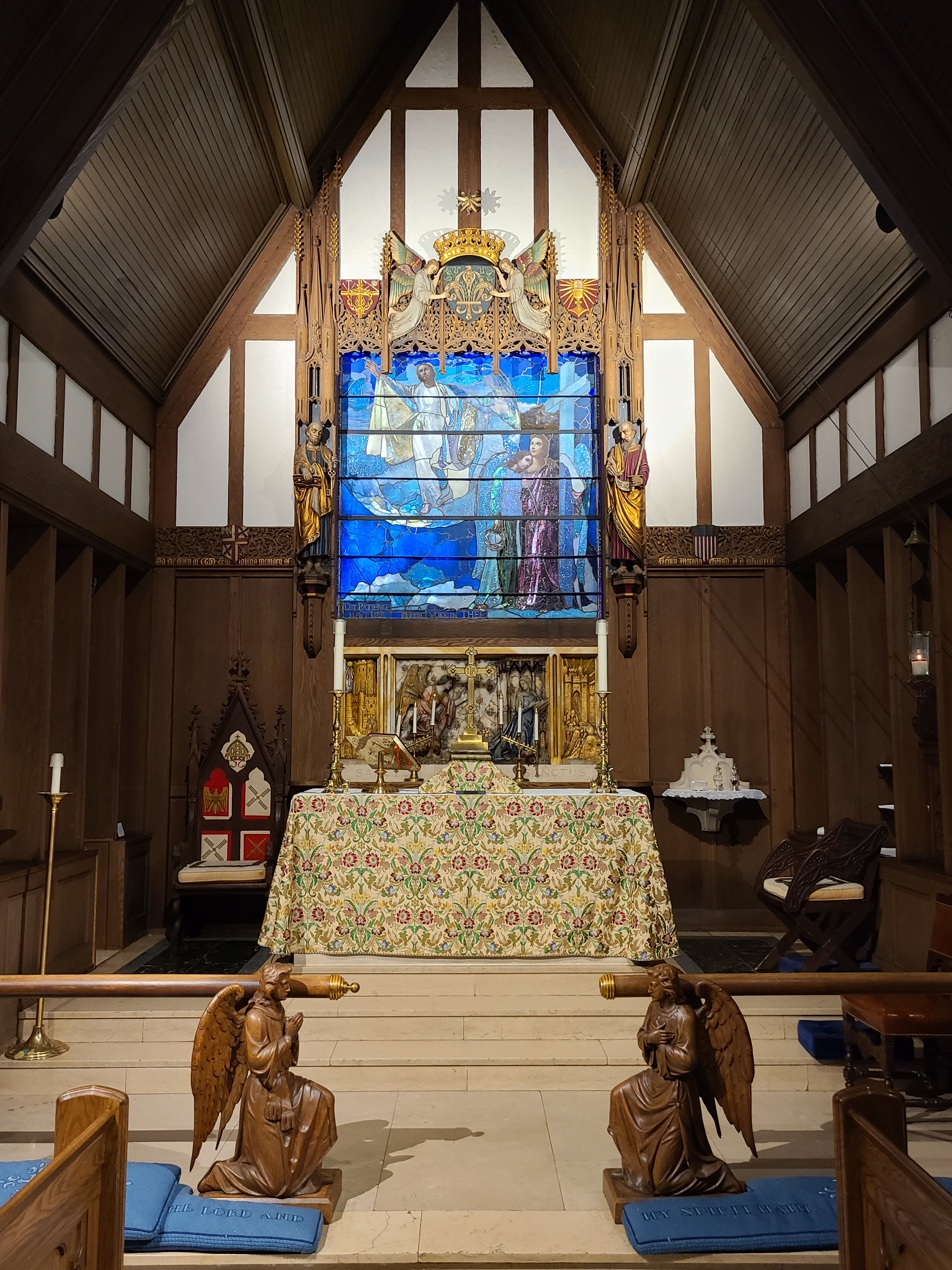
The sanctuary, designed by Bertram Goodhue and dedicated to Henry Morgan Tilford

Desiring to complement the work of Village architect Bruce Price, architect William A. Potter—known for his numerous contributions to Princeton University's campus—produced a Shingle style design for St. Mary's in 1887. Critic Montgomery Schuyler described St. Mary's as a "cottage church," a term he deemed appropriate given Tuxedo's resort status. Several experts, including Sarah Landau, Wayne Andrews and Lawrence Wodehouse, argue that the design for St. Mary's was influenced by the work of Henry Hobson Richardson; Wodehouse attributes the "emphasis on horizontal cornices and high-pitched roofs" of St. Mary's to Richardson's 1880 design for the Dr. James Bryant House in Cohasset, Massachusetts. One local influence was the nearby Tuxedo Park gatehouse, designed by Price and itself influenced by William Ralph Emerson's houses with "bouldered bases" (a phrase used by Landau to describe bases of buildings made of boulder-like stones) and Richardson's F. L. Ames Gate Lodge in North Easton, Massachusetts.

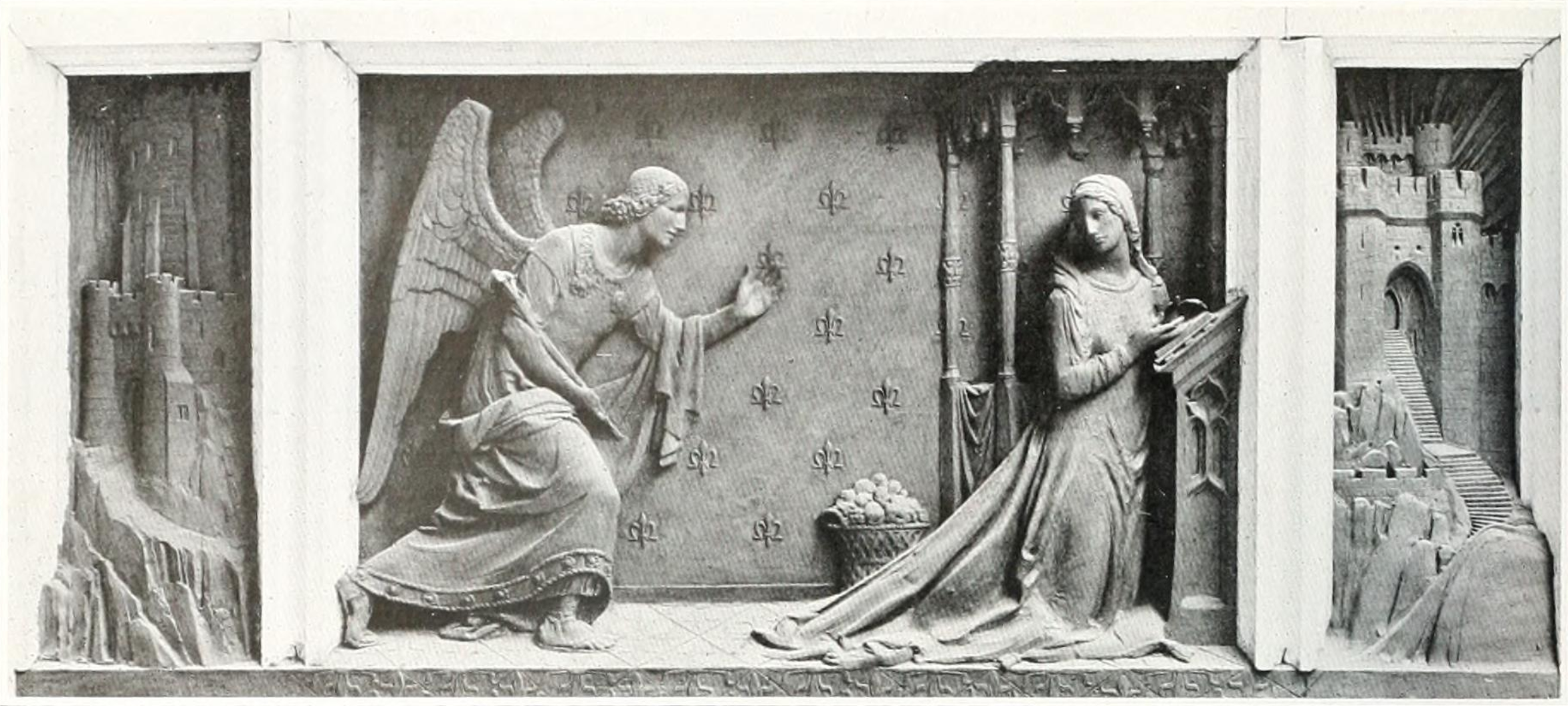
Sculptural panel depicting the Annunciation by Lee Lawrie (1922)

Although the church was originally designed with separate entrances for village residents and those who lived in the Town of Tuxedo, the latter entrance was ordered locked by the Reverend Merrill soon after his arrival at St. Mary's in 1894: it was never used again. More modifications came when the church was significantly expanded starting in 1897, with the addition of a further arch to the nave, a transept and a choir aisle. The final major alteration to the church's structure was the installation of the western aisle in 1904. A major aesthetic alteration occurred in 1922, when Isabelle Weart Giles arranged to have the church's sanctuary redesigned by the noted Gothic Revivalist architect Bertram Goodhue in honor of her late husband, Henry Morgan Tilford. Celebrated architectural sculptor Lee Lawrie contributed an alabaster and gold panel to the reredos as part of the redesign. An altar dedicated to St. Mark was installed at the foot of the western aisle in 1955, located in front of the since-replaced Hutchings-Votey organ given in honor of U.S. Representative and Tuxedo resident John Murray Mitchell.

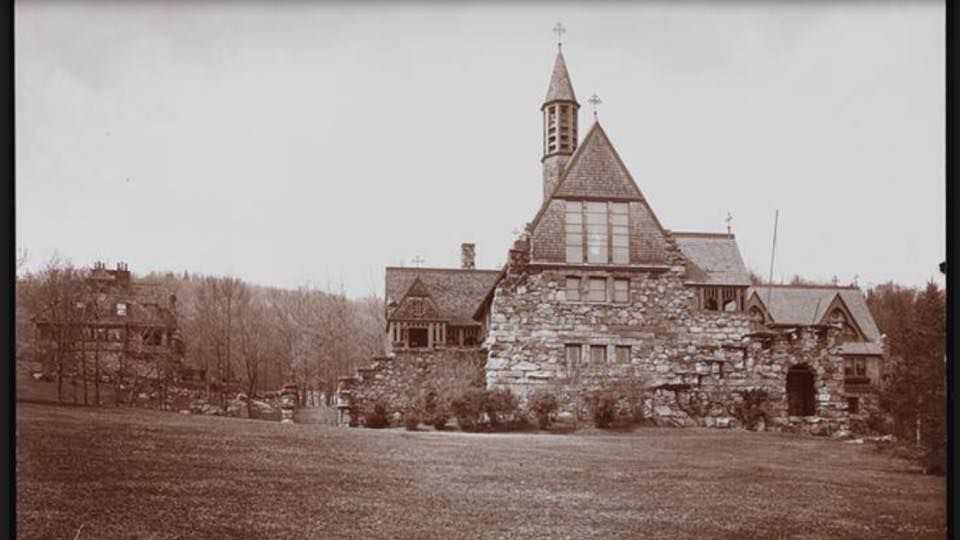
St. Mary's between the years 1901 and 1904, featuring Richard Howland Hunt's original shingle style rectory

Two additional architects contributed to the wider St. Mary's campus in its early days. The 1895 rectory, built at a cost of $12,000, was designed by Richard Howland Hunt in the same Shingle style as the nearby church. A sum of $8,000 was raised to construct a parish house, designed by Beaux-Arts architect James Brown Lord and built in 1901. Bishop Potter helped to lay its cornerstone in February 1901, before returning in June for the dedication.

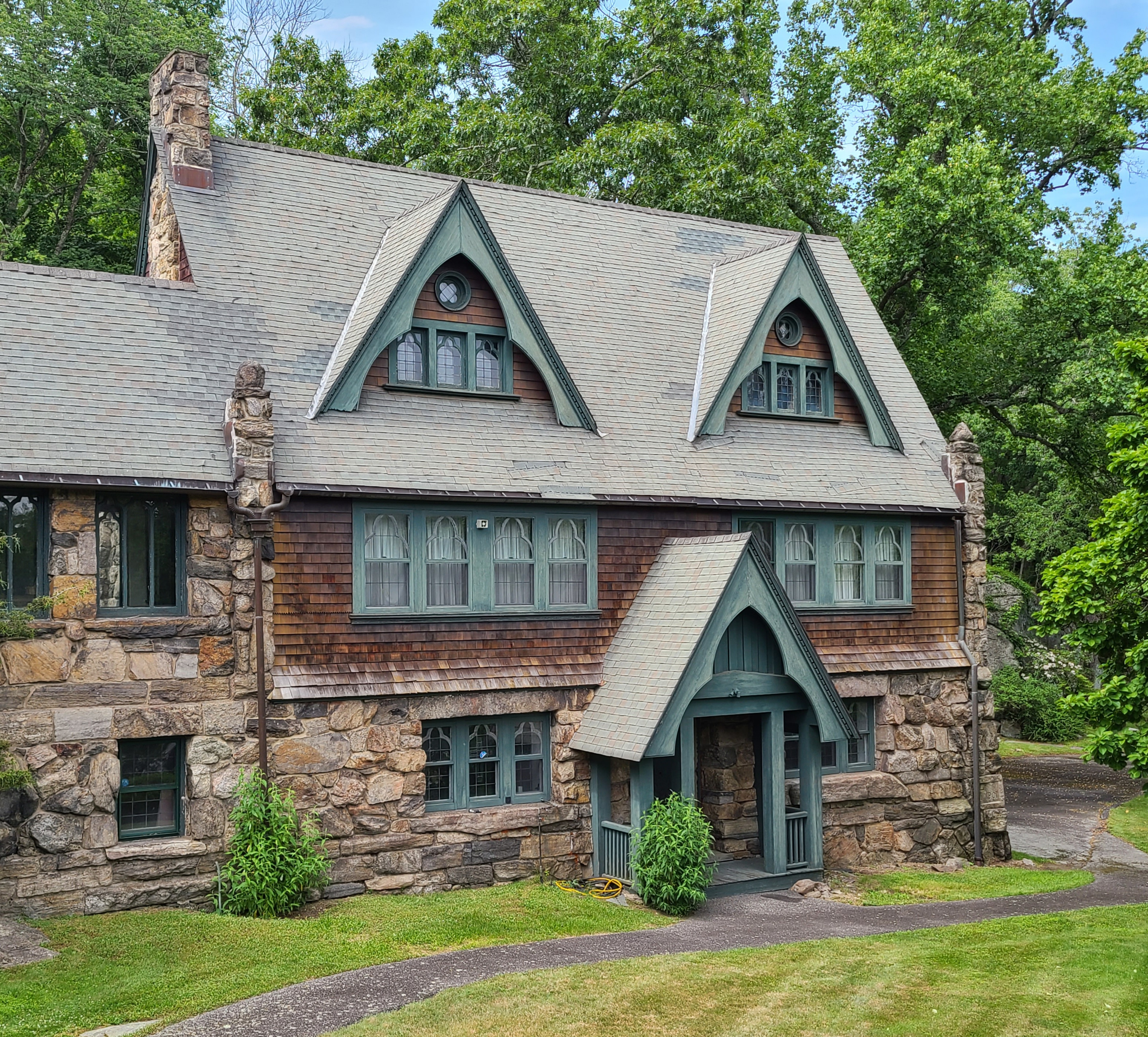
James Brown Lord's 1901 parish house

=== Chapel of the Holy Spirit ===
George de Ris of J&R Lamb Studios designed the Chapel of the Holy Spirit, located in the church's stone undercroft and described as being "built to suggest as nearly as possible a small Byzantine chapel." Completed in 1941, the Bishop of New York William Thomas Manning, dedicated the chapel to the late spouses of banker and Tuxedo resident Richard Delafield.

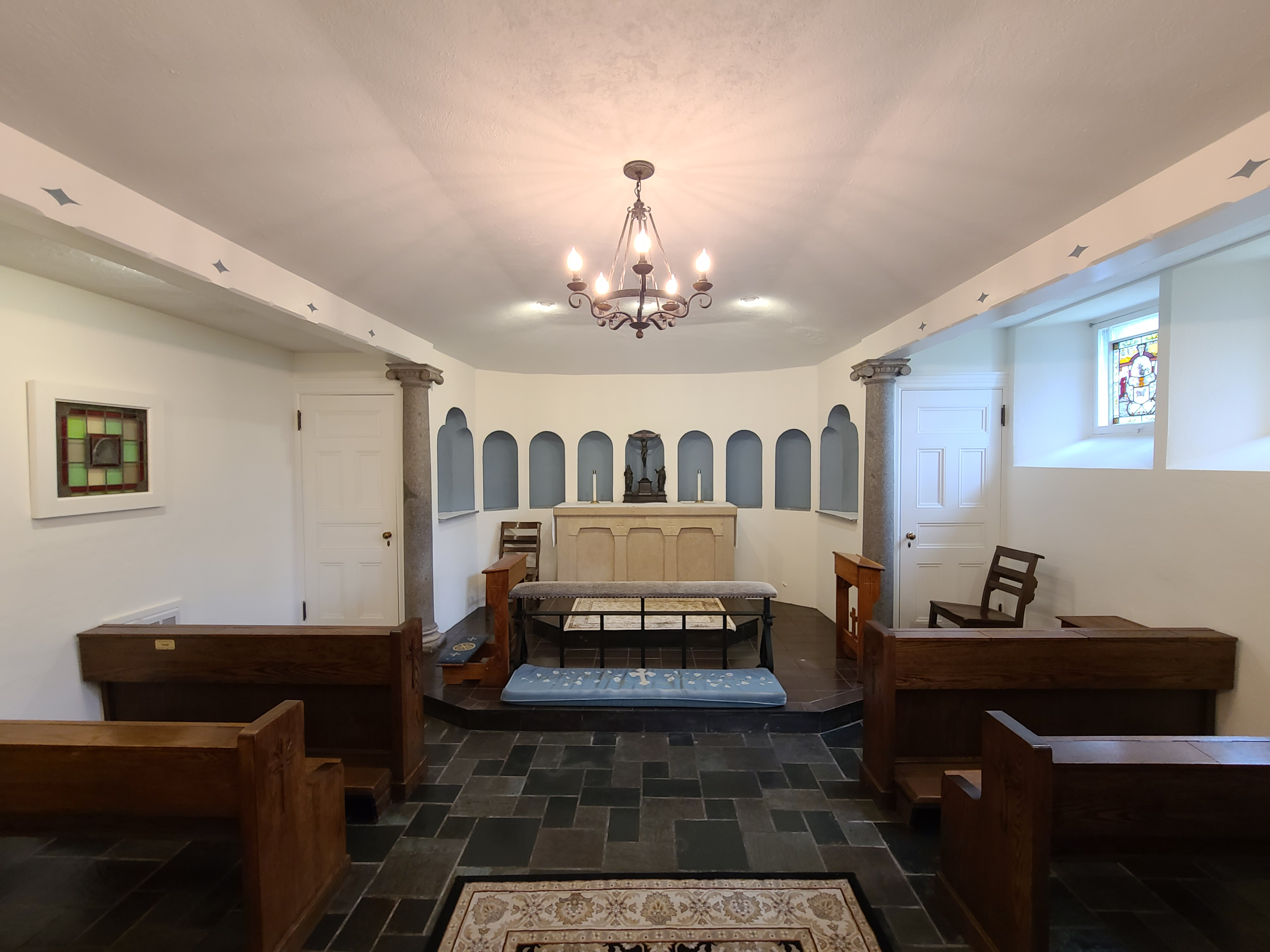
Chapel of the Holy Spirit

The chapel features elements taken from the Tuxedo Park homes of Richard Mortimer and Henry Morgan Tilford. These include an Italian marble hearthstone taken from Mortimer's since-demolished home "Mortemar" that now serves as the chapel's altar and multiple stained glass fragments that date from possibly as early as the 15th century, at least some of which were taken from the Tilford House. Several of the glass fragments are estimated to date from the 16th century. The chapel was renovated in 2015.

== Stained glass ==
St. Mary's is home to an array of stained glass produced by several leading American studios around the turn of the 20th century, including works by Louis Comfort Tiffany, Charles Lamb, John La Farge, Walter Janes and Henry Wynd Young. A window dedicated to Emily Post's son Bruce Price Post was made by J. Gordon Guthrie, an artist noted for his use of the color red in stained glass. Several windows have been restored in recent years. St. Mary's was featured as part of the New York Landmarks Conservancy's seventh annual Sacred Sites Open House Weekend in 2017.

=== List of windows ===
- Louis Comfort Tiffany:
  - "Edith Godfrey Memorial" (presumed)
  - "Pilgrim Window" - Memorial to William Lawrence Breese
  - "George Preston Memorial" - Preston Memorial Window (also referred to as the Hoffman Memorial Window)
  - "St. Elizabeth" - De Rham Memorial Window
  - "Crown of Life, St. Gertrude" - Memorial to Emily Post Griswold (May 10, 1905)
  - "Cross in a Field of Painted Flowers" - Memorial to Charles Henry Coster, partner at J.P. Morgan and prominent philatelist
  - "Angel Playing a Musical Instrument" - Dated 1890 (presumed)
- Walter Janes (designed with Frances White):
  - "St. John the Divine" - Installed in 1898 in memory of Southern Pacific vice president Charles Frederick Crocker
- John La Farge:
  - "Belief in the Resurrection" - Dated 1890; commissioned by Pierre Lorillard in memory of his son, Nathaniel Griswold Lorillard (1864-1888), who according to one account introduced the Tuxedo jacket to American circles; one of the two preliminary sketches for the window was exhibited at the La Farge Memorial Exhibition held at the Museum of Fine Arts, Boston in 1911.
- J&R Lamb Studios:
  - "Jesus with Angels" - Andrae Memorial Window (also called "Resurrection")
  - "Iselin Memorial" - Memorial to Fannie Garner Iselin (presumed Lamb Studios)
  - Vestibule windows - These windows in the narthex were dedicated to Gabriel and Francine Demay on May 7, 1989, in celebration of the St. Mary's centennial.
- J. Gordon Guthrie:
  - "Christ the Good Shepherd" - Neo-gothic, Arts & Crafts painted window in memory of Bruce Price Post, an acclaimed architect associated with the firm of Kenneth MacKenzie Murchison. Notable designs include the Bethlehem Union Station and the New Colonial Hotel.
- Henry Wynd Young:
  - "R. J. Mortimer, Jr. Memorial"

=== Images of stained glass ===
==== Church windows ====
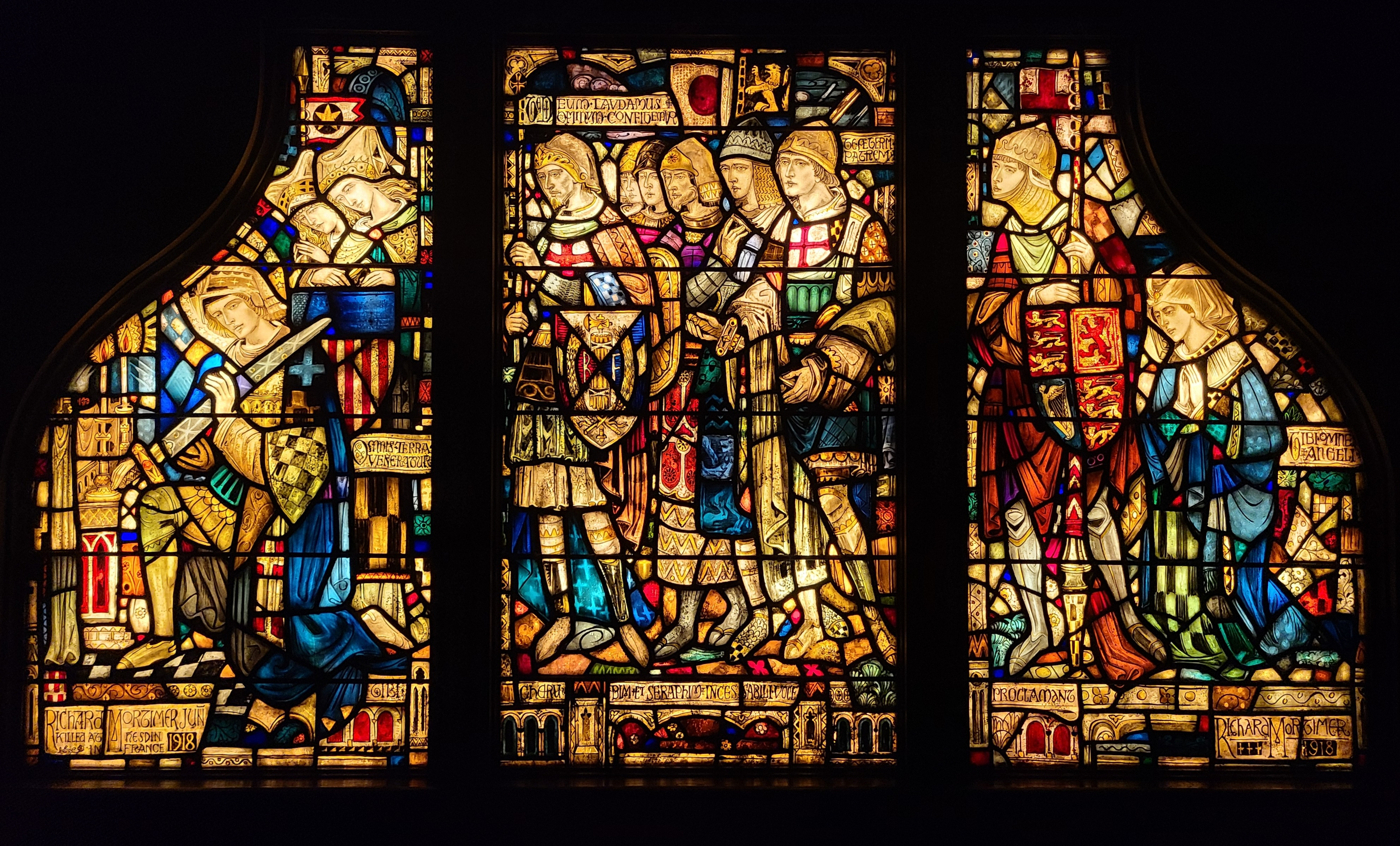
"R.J. Mortimer, Jr. Memorial" - Henry Wynd Young (1874-1923)

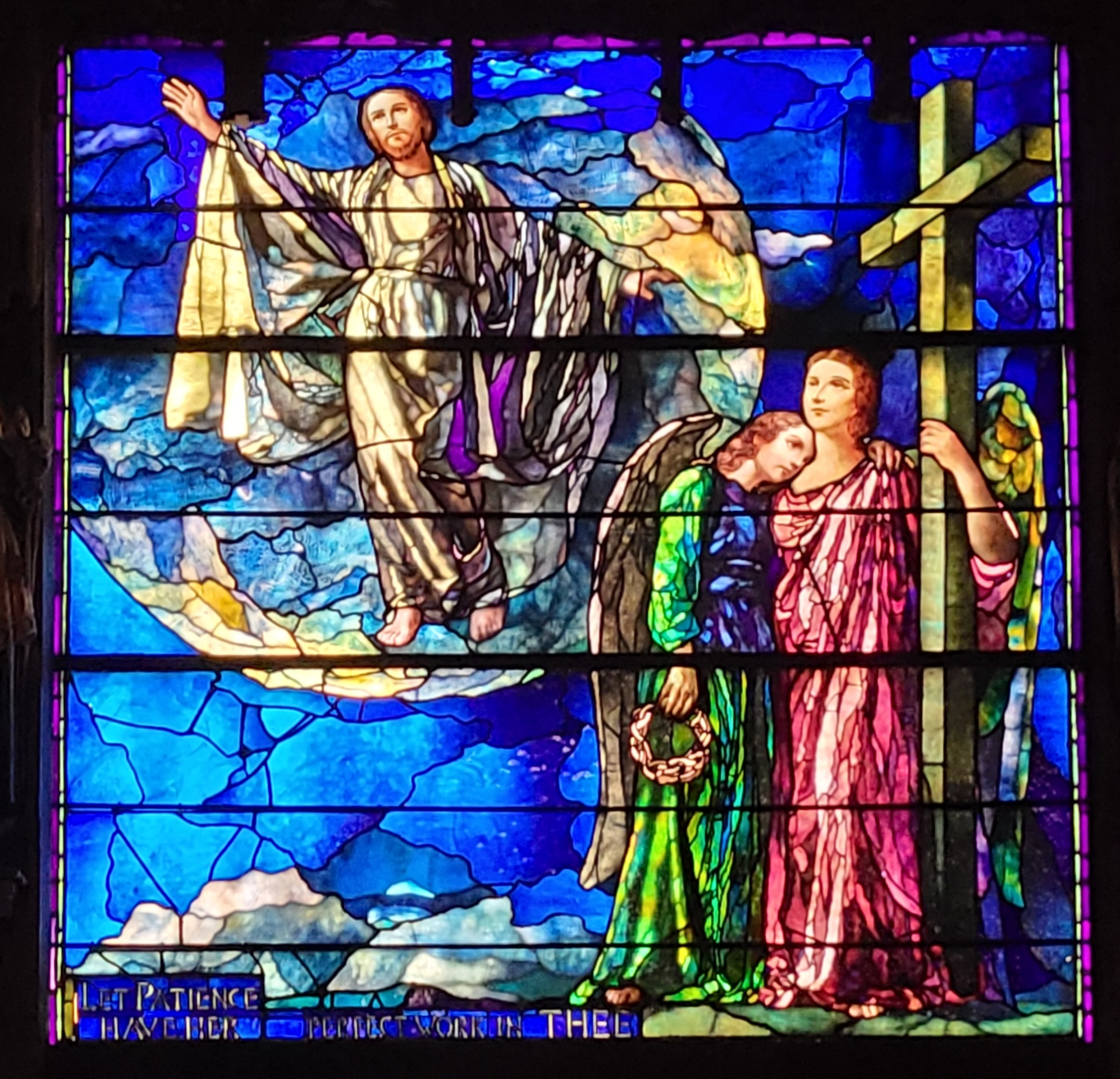
"Belief in the Resurrection" - Apse Window by John La Farge, in memory of Nathaniel Griswold Lorillard

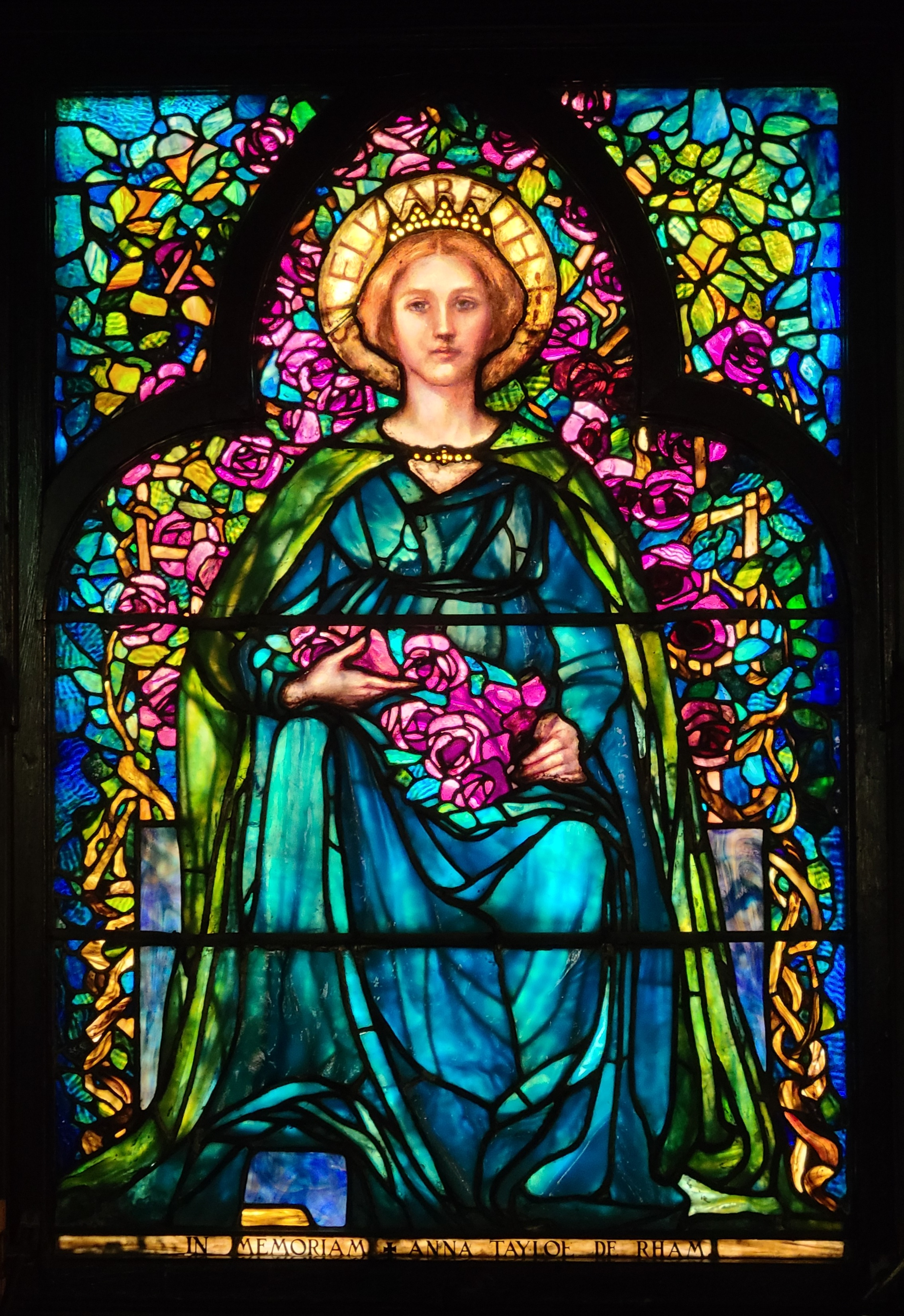
"St. Elizabeth" - In memory of Anna Taylor de Rham, by Louis Comfort Tiffany

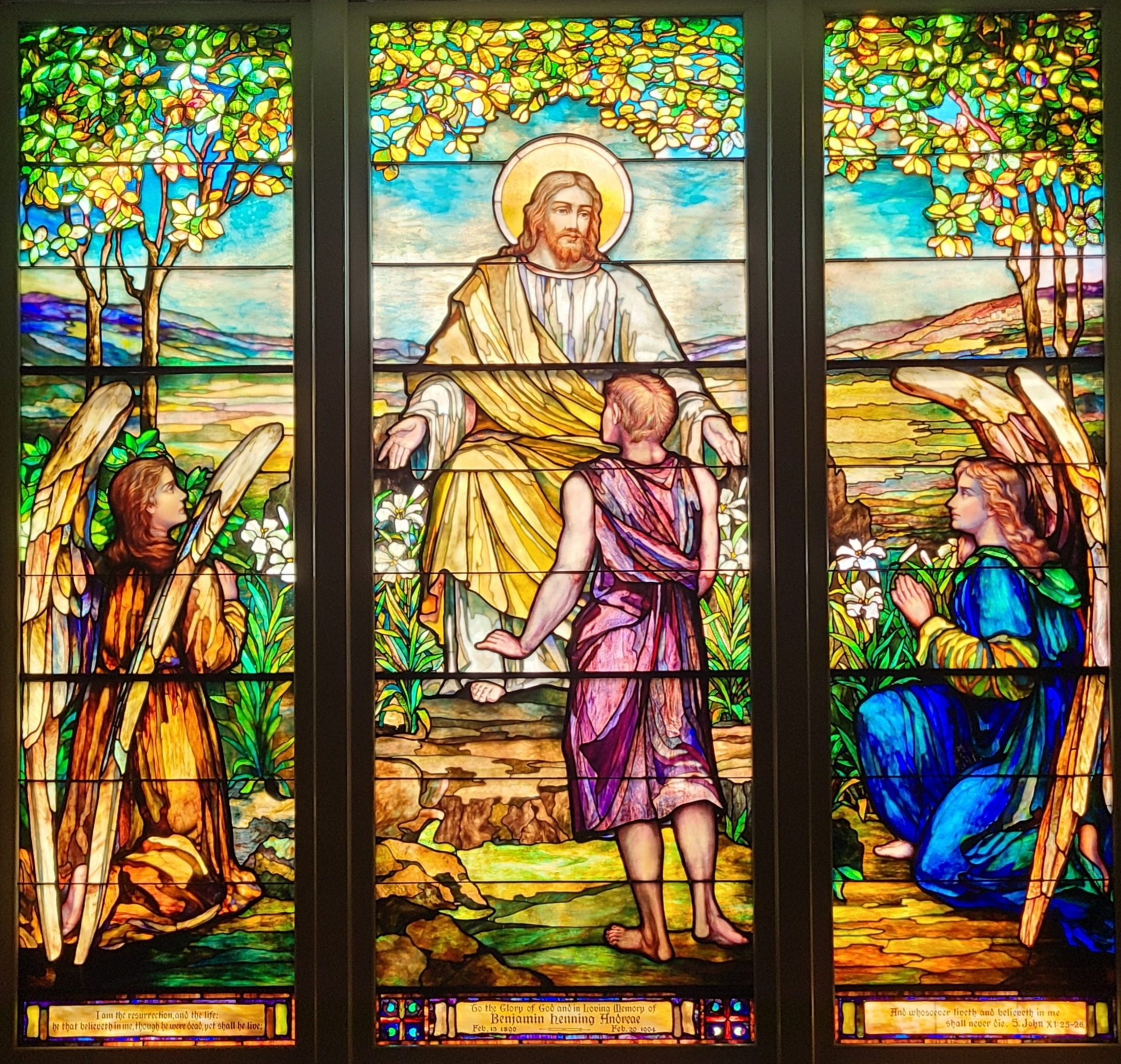
"Jesus with Angels" - Memorial to Benjamin Henning Andrae, by Lamb Studios

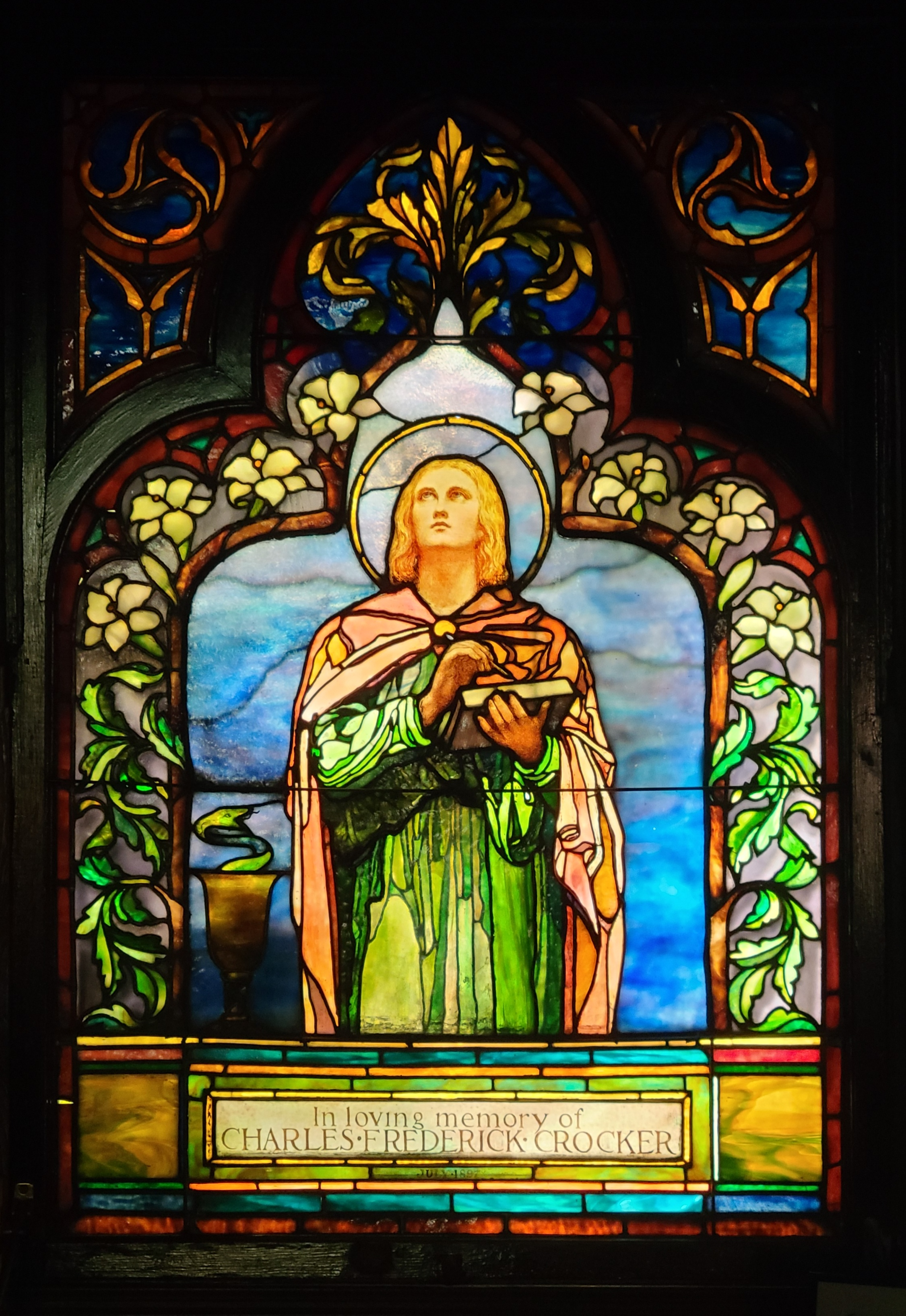
"St. John the Divine" - Memorial to Charles Frederick Crocker, by Walter Janes

==== Chapel windows ====
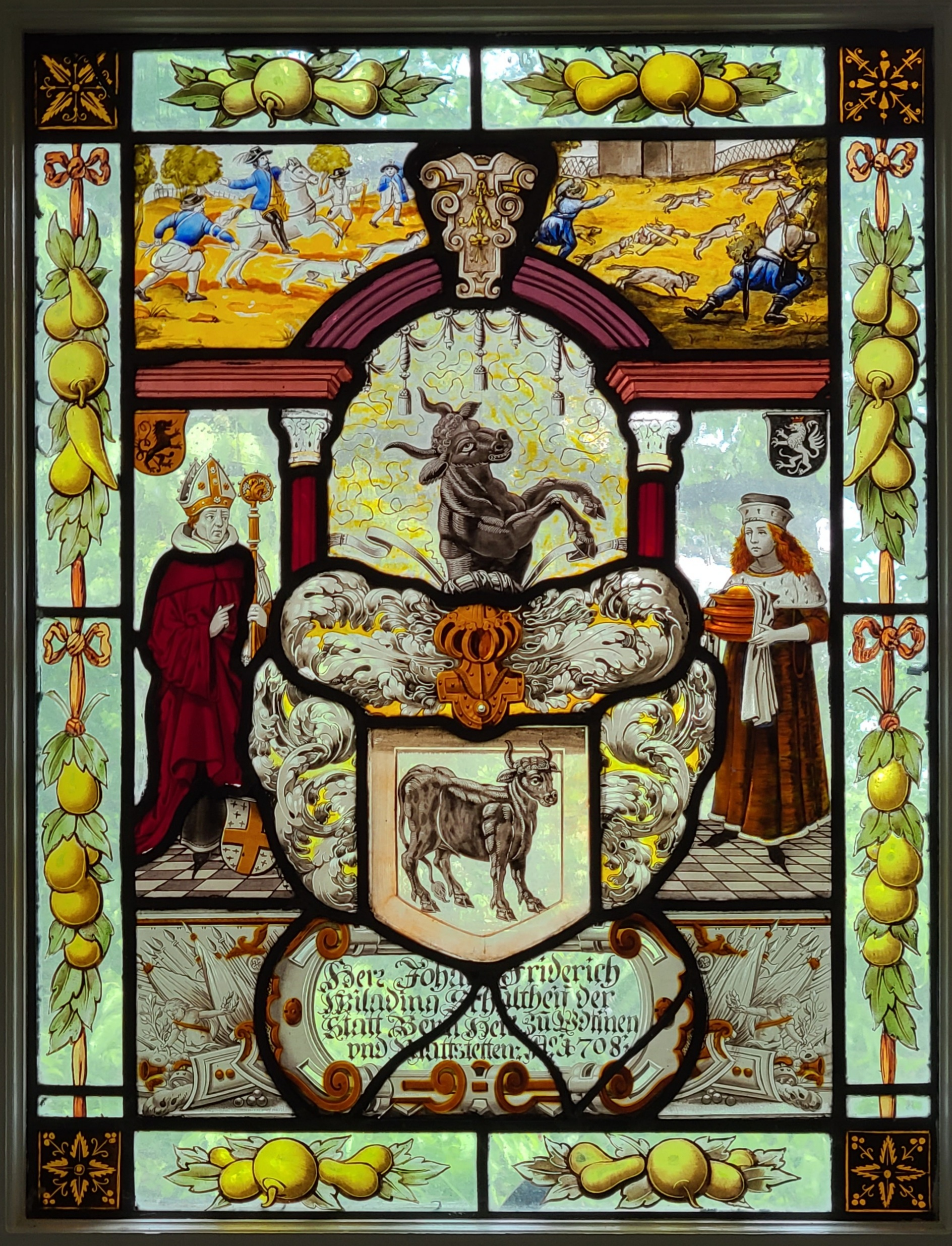
A window featuring 16th- to 17th-century Swiss heraldic glass fragments in the Chapel of the Holy Spirit

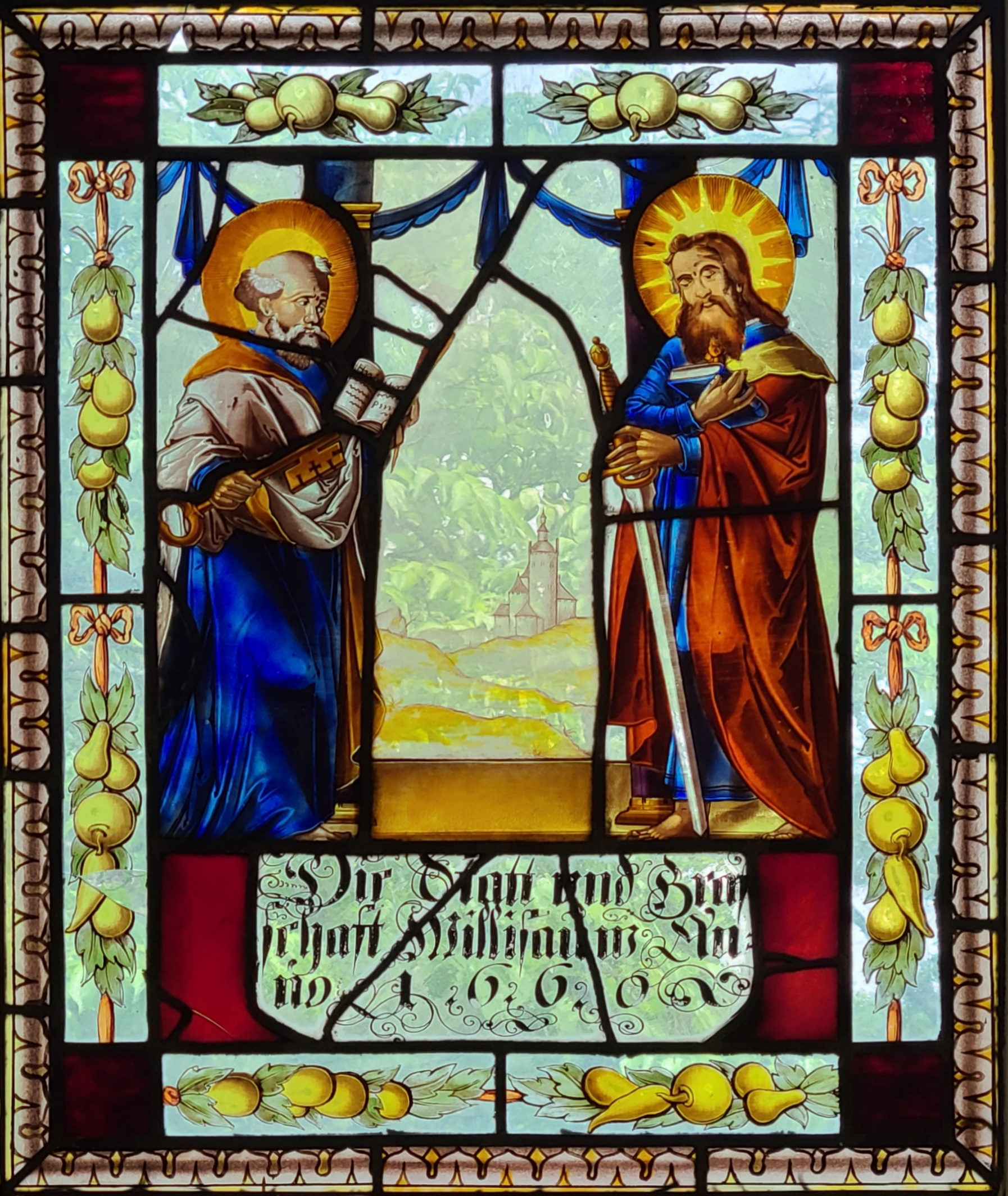
A chapel window with fragments dated to 1660

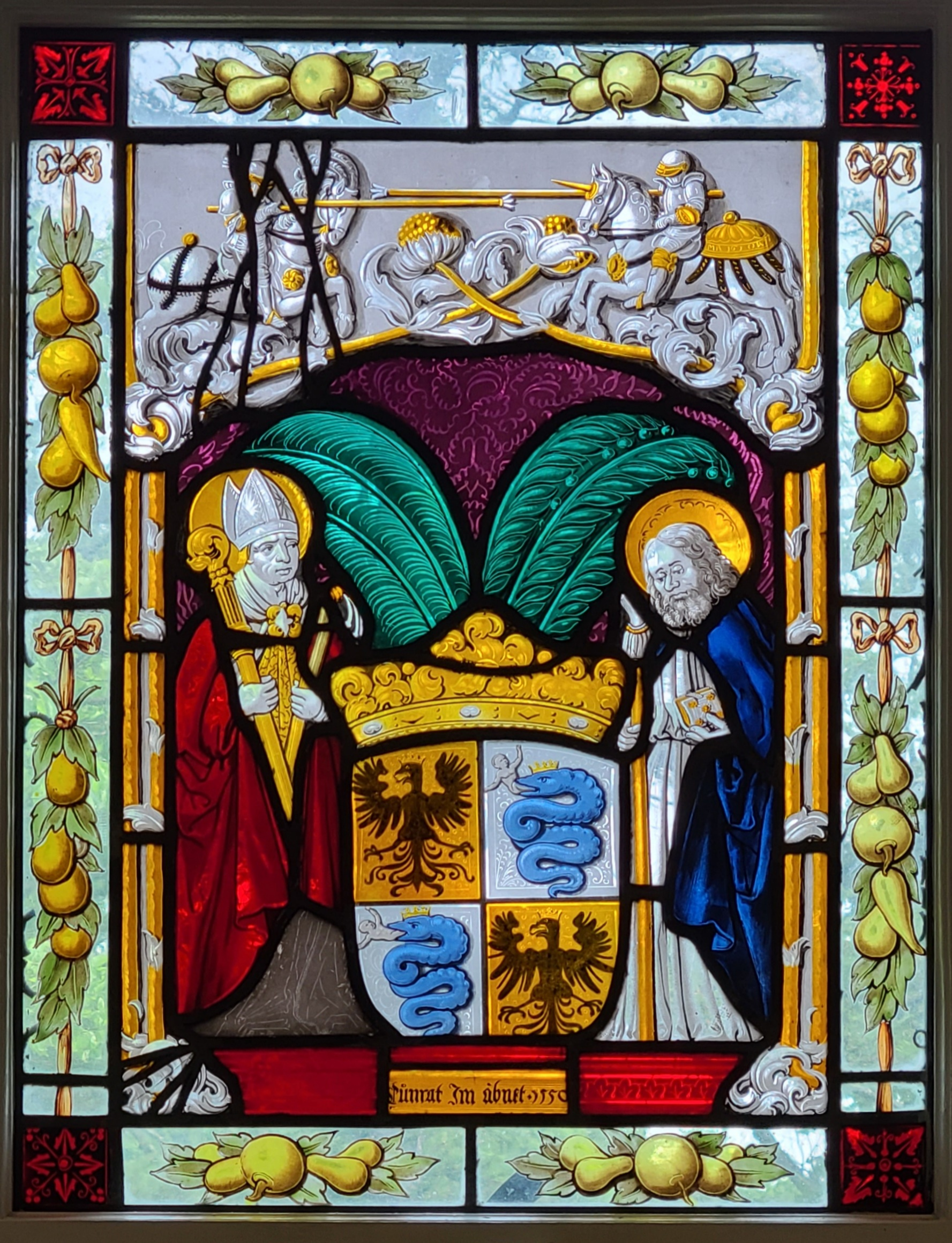
The third example of heraldic glass

== Today ==
The current rector at St. Mary's is the Rev. Richard James Robÿn, who previously served as the 31st rector of Trinity Church Oxford in Philadelphia. Robÿn is a charter member of the North American province of the Society of Catholic Priests and presently serves as Treasurer on the Provincial Council as of April 2023. St. Mary's tenth rector, the Rev. Dr. Edwin H. Cromey, serves as Rector Emeritus as of April 2023.

Services of Holy Communion are held twice every Sunday at St. Mary's: a spoken Eucharist at 8am using Rite I of the 1979 Book of Common Prayer at the St. Mark's altar and one at 10am in the church using music and hymns (Rite II). Additional services include a 10am Eucharist held on Wednesdays, and a 5pm Evening service held at the St. Mark's altar from February through April. The St. Mary's website estimates the church's capacity at 300, although past services have hosted as many as 500 guests.

St. Mary's rectors also conduct services and serve as priests-in-charge of St. John's in Arden, a country chapel whose cemetery serves as the final resting place of railroad magnate E. H. Harriman. Erected by the Parrott family in 1863 on the former Arden estate, St. John's hosts three public services annually—on Thanksgiving Day, Christmas Eve and Easter Sunday. These services use the 1928 Book of Common Prayer and the 1940 Hymnal.

== Burials and memorials ==
The cemetery at St. Mary's was established in 1910, soon after the deaths of Pierre Lorillard's daughter Emily Lorillard Kent and her husband William Kent, a Senior Warden at St. Mary's and great-grandson of James Kent. A columbarium was installed in 1968. Burials at St. Mary's include:

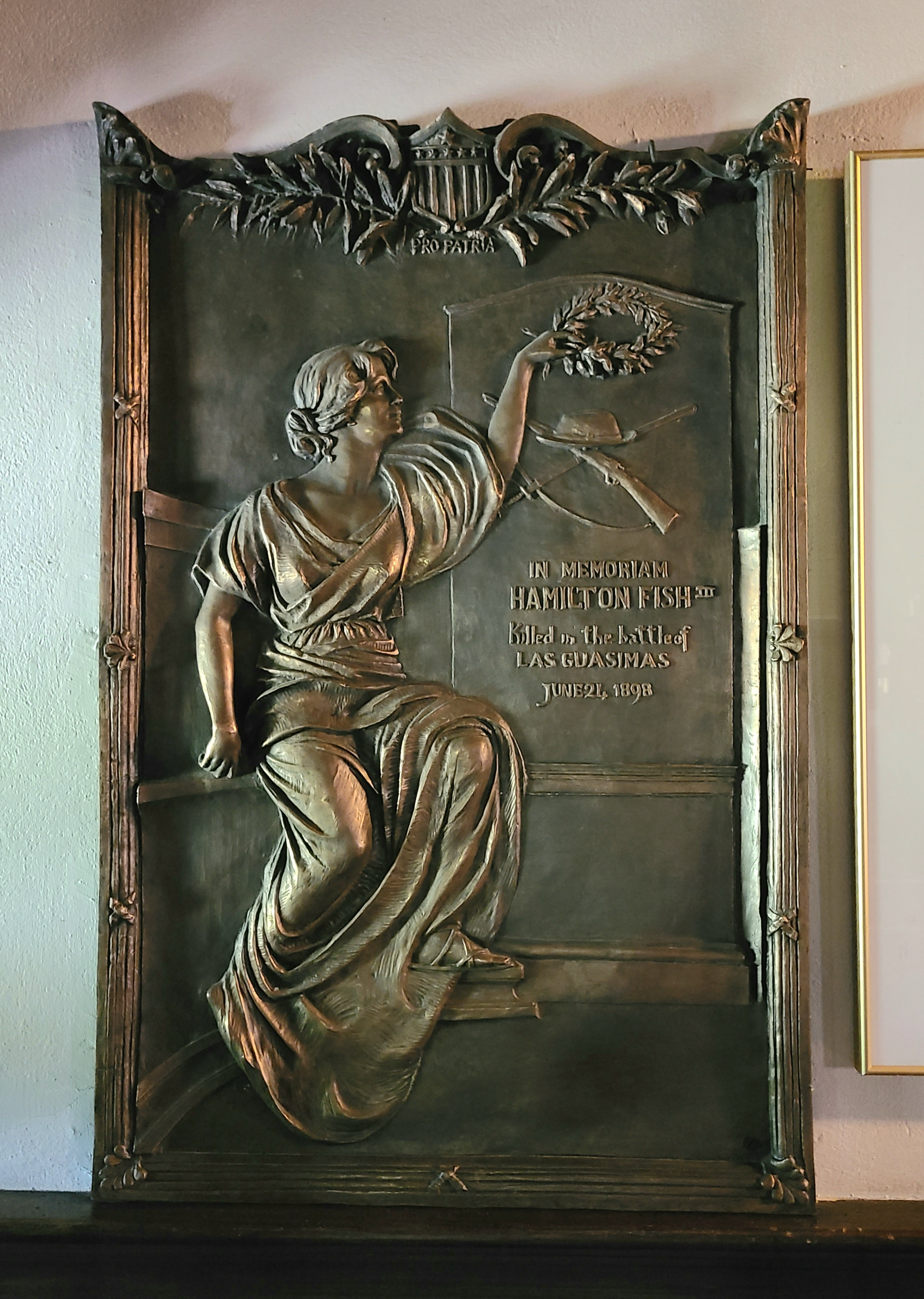
Memorial plaque to Hamilton Fish, located on the south wall of the nave

- Pierre Lorillard Barbey, son of socialite Mary Lorillard Barbey
- John Insley Blair II, grandson of railroad magnate John Insley Blair
- Clarence F. Busch, portrait artist; exhibited pieces at four of the National Academy of Design's annual exhibitions and the Findlay Galleries
- Price Collier, former Unitarian minister, author and father of Katherine St. George
- Richard Delafield, President of the National Park Bank and senior warden of Trinity Church
- Frederic de Peyster Foster, lawyer, philanthropist and president of the Saint Nicholas Society of the City of New York
- Theodore Frelinghuysen, socialite included in McAllister's "Four Hundred"
- Pauline Leroy French, daughter of banker Amos Tuck French
- Frederic Augustus Juilliard, nephew and heir of Augustus D. Juilliard
- Katherine Lorillard "Kitty" Kernochan, daughter of socialite and businessman James Powell Kernochan
- Ellen Farnsworth Loomis, wife of investment banker and scientist Alfred Lee Loomis
- Winthrop McKim, nephew of Buchanan Winthrop and descendent of Massachusetts Bay Colony leaders Joseph Dudley and Wait Winthrop
- John Jay Mortimer, financier and grandson of Henry Morgan Tilford and Richard Mortimer
- Richard Mortimer, member of McAllister's "Four Hundred", real estate investor and St. Mary's vestryman
- Augusta and Louis Ogden, couple who were aboard RMS Carpathia during the Titanic disaster rescue efforts.
- Herbert Claiborne Pell, father of U.S. Representative and Minister Herbert Pell
- Emily Post, American socialite and author known for her work on etiquette
- George Baker Bligh St. George, grandson of financier George Fisher Baker
- Katherine St. George, cousin of Franklin Delano Roosevelt and Republican member of the U.S. House of Representatives
- Henry Morgan Tilford, oil magnate; considered the founder of Standard Oil of California (today known as Chevron)
- Eugénie Ambrose Philbin Tuck, daughter of Manhattan District Attorney Eugene Ambrose Philbin

=== Memorials ===
The memorials housed in St. Mary's have been recorded in the church's "Book of Remembrance", a book compiled by the St. Mary's Altar Guild and illuminated by the Sisters of St. Mary in Peekskill, New York. Those for whom memorial tablets are dedicated at St. Mary's include:

- The Rev. George William Douglas, Canon of the Cathedral of St. John the Divine; known to have delivered a sermon on conscientious objectors at St. Mary's in 1917, first delivered at Holy Trinity Church in Brooklyn and later printed by Richard Delafield to distribute to the 400 employees of the National Park Bank
- Hamilton Fish, Rough Rider and member of the Fish family
- Maude Lorillard Baring, daughter of Pierre Lorillard IV and wife of Cecil Baring of Baring Brothers & Co.

== See also ==
- List of Anglican Churches
- Anglican Communion
