= Richard Mortimer =

American real estate investor

- Born: April 24, 1852; New York City, U.S.
- Died: March 16, 1918 (aged 65); Palm Beach, Florida, U.S.
- Resting place: St. Mary's-in-Tuxedo Episcopal Church Cemetery, Tuxedo Park, New York, U.S.
- Spouse: Eleanor Jay Chapman (m. 1886)
- Children: 4
- Relatives: John Jay Mortimer (grandson); Stanley G. Mortimer Jr. (grandson)

Richard Mortimer (April 24, 1852 – March 15, 1918) was an American real estate investor and society leader during the Gilded Age.

== Early life ==
Mortimer was born in New York City on April 24, 1852. He was the son of William Yates Mortimer (1824–1891) of New York and Anna Elizabeth (née Thorpe) Mortimer (1829–1905) of Albany. His siblings Minnie and Wilfred Mortimer died young. His younger brother, Stanley Yates Mortimer was married to Elizabeth Livingston Hall, (Note: Elizabeth's sister, Anna Rebecca Hall (mother of First Lady, Eleanor Roosevelt), was married to Elliott Bulloch Roosevelt, the son of Theodore Roosevelt Sr. and brother of U.S. President Theodore Roosevelt.) the second daughter of Valentine Hall Jr. a banker and merchant. His paternal grandparents were Richard Mortimer and Harriett Cordelia Thompson; Richard Mortimer was born in Cleckheaton, Yorkshire and emigrated to America in 1816, eventually becoming a wealthy merchant. William Yates Mortimer was named after his uncle William Yates, a woollen manufacturer. Richard's maternal grandfather was Aaron Thorpe of Albany, New York.

== Career ==
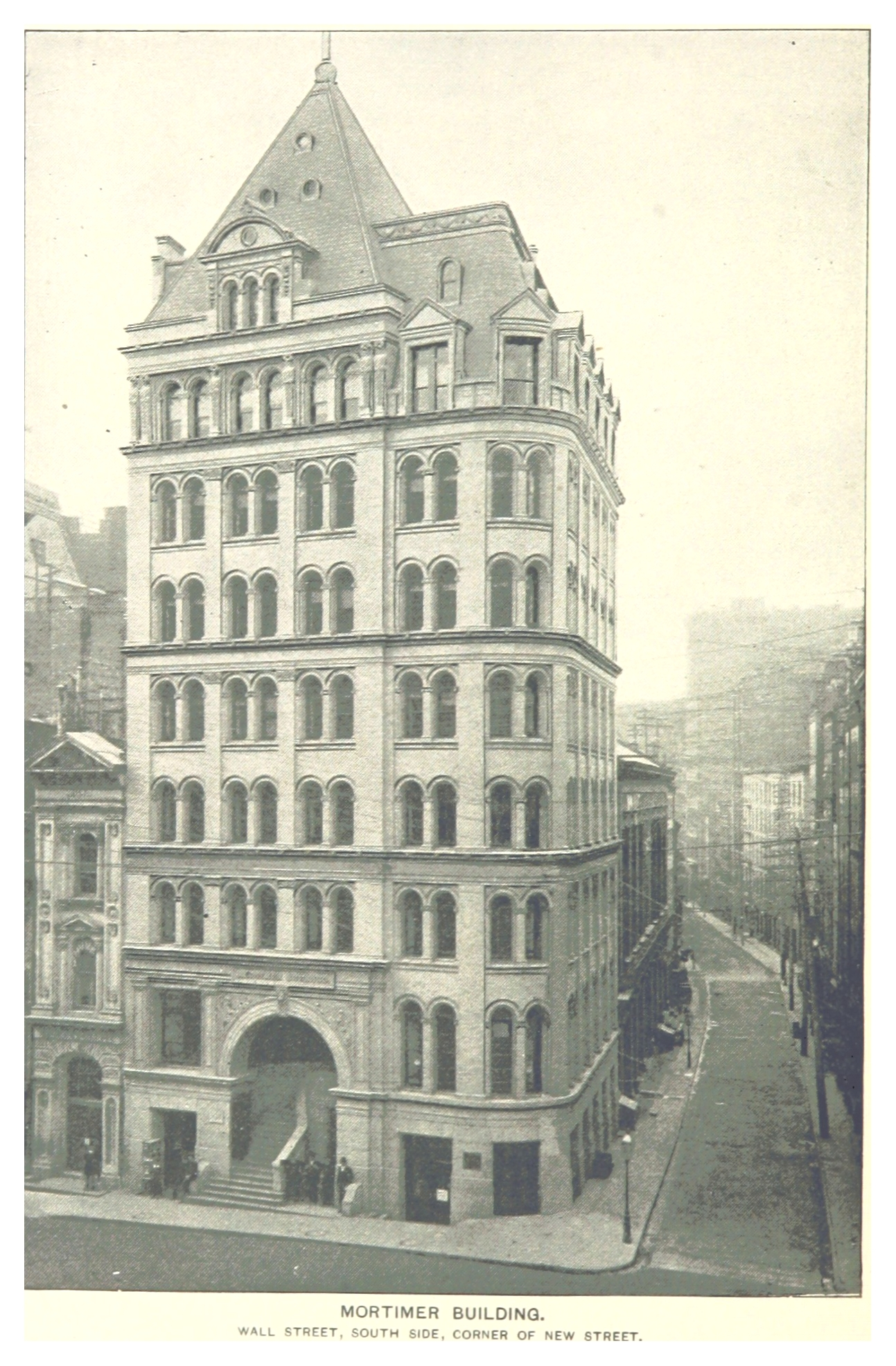
The Mortimer Building, built by Mortimer's father in 1885.

Richard received an education in Germany before returning to New York in 1872 at the age of 20 to assist in management of the Mortimer family estate, which included the Mortimer Building on Broadway. In 1882 Richard inherited a large fortune upon the death of his grandfather Richard Mortimer. An additional Mortimer Building was commissioned in 1884 by Richard's father W.Y. Mortimer and completed in 1885, which building was acquired by the New York Stock Exchange for $745,000 in December 1918. The Mortimer family's real estate holdings were extensive, and rivalled in size the estates owned by such prominent New York families as the Astors and Goelets.

=== Society life ===
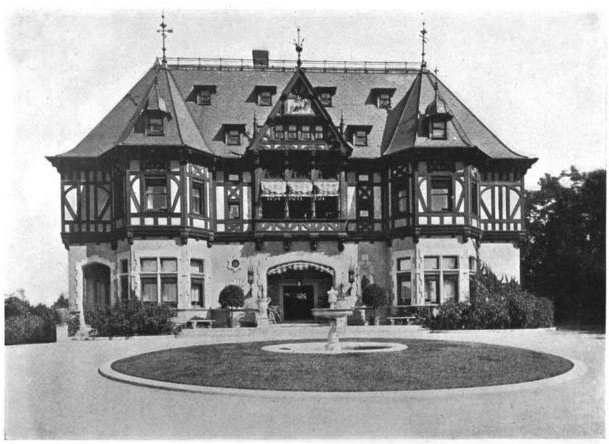
Mortemar, the Mortimers home in Tuxedo Park, c. 1905.

In 1892, Mortimer and his wife Eleanor were included in Ward McAllister's "Four Hundred", purported to be an index of New York's best families, published in The New York Times. Conveniently, 400 was the number of people that could fit into Mrs. Astor's ballroom. Mortimer, a member of the Tuxedo Club, Metropolitan Club, Knickerbocker Club, Union Club, City Club, Racquet Club, Coaching Club, Riding Club and Westminster Kennel Club, wore a cravat that covered his throat with "a diamond stickpin so big that his friends called him "Flashlight Dick." Along with the Lorillards, the Mortimers were one of the founding families of Tuxedo Park, New York. Their home in Tuxedo was known as Mortemar, a "turreted four-story mansion." Mortemar was designed by Richard Howland Hunt of Hunt & Hunt. Construction began in the 1890s and continued for 10 years.

== Personal life ==
Richard Mortimer married Eleanor Jay Chapman (1864–1929) on April 26, 1886, who was the daughter of Henry Grafton Chapman Jr. (son of abolitionist Maria Weston Chapman), president of the New York Stock Exchange. and Eleanor (née Jay) Chapman (daughter of John Jay, the U.S. Minister to Austria-Hungary under Grant). She was a descendant of John Jay, first Chief Justice of the United States. His uncle was John Jay Chapman (husband to Elizabeth Astor Winthrop Chanler), Together, they had a townhouse at 382 Fifth Avenue and had the following children.

- Mary Eleanor Mortimer (1887–1958), who married Maxime Hubert Furlaud (1877–1973).
- Richard Mortimer Jr. (1888–1918), a Harvard graduate who died in a plane crash in France.
- Stanley Grafton Mortimer (1889–1947), a stockbroker who married Katherine Hunt Tilford (1890–1970), daughter of Henry M. Tilford, in 1911.
- Wilfreda Mortimer (1892–1968), who married John Morris Livingston Rutherfurd (1888–1971), a descendant of U.S. Senator John Rutherfurd and signer of the Declaration of Independence Lewis Morris, in 1911. They divorced in Paris in 1923 and she married Charles Frederick Frothingham Jr. (1888–1963), a son of Charles F. Frothingham, in November 1924.

Mortimer died on March 15, 1918, in Palm Beach, Florida, where he had gone for his health. He was buried at St. Mary's-in-Tuxedo Church Cemetery in Tuxedo Park, New York. His entire estate was left to his widow, Eleanor, who died at her home, 555 Park Avenue, after several months illness, in December 1929.

=== Descendants ===
Through his daughter Mary, he was the grandfather of Richard Mortimer Furlaud (1923–2018), the president and C.E.O. of Squibb Beech-Nut (which became Bristol-Myers Squibb); and Maxime Jay Furlaud (1925–1999).

Through his son Stanley, he was the grandfather of Stanley G. Mortimer Jr. (1913–1999), who was married to Babe Paley, and then Kathleen Harriman; Henry Tilford Mortimer (1916–1993), Richard Mortimer, Eve Mortimer (1918–2007), who married Clarence Pell, Jr., and later Lewis Cass Ledyard III; Katharine Mortimer (1923–2003), who married three times (including to Francis Xavier Shields, their grandchild was actress Brooke Shields); and John Jay Mortimer (1935–2013), a prominent financier.

Through his daughter Wilfreda, he was the grandfather of John Mortimer Rutherfurd (1913–1966); Jay Rutherfurd (1916–2005); and Nathaniel Frothingham (1927–2001).
