= Tabitha Simmons =

British fashion designer

- Born: Cambridgeshire, England
- Education: Kingston University
- Occupations: Fashion designer; stylist; magazine editor
- Spouse(s): Craig McDean (divorced); Robert Livingston Mortimer (m.2018)
- Children: 3

Tabitha Simmons is a British fashion designer, stylist, and magazine editor.

== Biography ==
Simmons was born and raised in rural Cambridgeshire. She attended Kingston University, where she studied film and set design. While at university, Simmons worked as a fashion model.

After a short career in modelling, Simmons began working as a stylist. She worked for Jefferson Hack at Dazed. She moved to New York City and signed a styling contract with Calvin Klein and Dolce & Gabbana. She also styled runway shoes for Alexander McQueen.

Simmons is a contributing editor at Vogue. She partnered with Swarovski on a jewellery line and designed a clothing line for Equipment.

In 2009, Simmons launched her own shoe company. She was awarded the Emerging Talent Prize British Fashion Awards in 2011. In 2015, she won a CFDA Award for Accessories Designer of the Year. In 2017, she won a Glamour Award for Best Accessories Designer. In 2019, she was nominated for another CFDA Award.

Simmons was married to British photographer Craig McDean and has two sons, Dylan and Elliot McDean. The family lived in a 5-story Queen Anne Revival townhouse in Chelsea, Manhattan. She and McDean divorced in 2013.

She began dating Robert Livingston "Topper" Mortimer, the son of John Jay Mortimer, in 2014 after they met in The Hamptons. On 29 January 2018 Simmons gave birth to a daughter, Violet Elizabeth Mortimer. She and Mortimer were married in an Episcopal service at the Church of the Resurrection on 9 June 2018. A reception was held at The Brook followed by an after party at Dorrian's Red Hand Restaurant. Wedding guests included Tory Burch, Dasha Zhukova, Hamish Bowles, Katie Grand, Karen Elson, Lily Aldridge, Lauren Santo Domingo, Alejandro Santo Domingo, Lady Charlotte Wellesley, Fabiola Beracasa Beckman, Minnie Mortimer, Georgina Chapman, Liv Tyler, and Sienna Miller. Her husband had previously been married to socialite and reality television personality Tinsley Mortimer.
