= John Mortimer (disambiguation) =

John Mortimer (1923–2009) was a British writer.

John Mortimer may also refer to:

- John B. Mortimer, Hong Kong judge
- Jack Cade, leader of the Kent rebellion
- John Mortimer (musician), in heavy metal band Holocaust
- John Mortimer (MP) for Northamptonshire
- John Robert Mortimer (1825–1911), archaeologist
- John Mortimer (agriculturalist) (1656–1736), English merchant and writer on agriculture
- John Hamilton Mortimer (1740–1779), British painter and printmaker
- John Jay Mortimer (1933–2013), American financier

== See also ==
- Johnnie Mortimer (1931–1992), British television scriptwriter
- John Mortimore (disambiguation)
