= Juilliard (disambiguation) =

Juilliard may refer to:

- Juilliard School, a performing-arts conservatory in New York City
- Augustus D. Juilliard (1836–1919), American businessman and philanthropist, whose estate founded the Juilliard School
- Frederic Augustus Juilliard (1868–1937), nephew and heir of Augustus D. Juilliard
- Juilliard v. Greenman, 110 U.S. 421 (1884), a U.S. Supreme Court case brought by Augustus D. Juilliard, upholding the constitutionality of the Legal Tender Acts of 1862 and 1863

== See also ==
- Julliard (disambiguation)
