= John Mortimore =

John Mortimore is the name of:

- John Mortimore (cricketer) (1933–2014) English cricketer
- John Mortimore (footballer) (1934–2021) English football player and manager

== See also ==
- John Mortimer (disambiguation)
