= Charles F. Frothingham =

American stockbroker, corporate director (c. 1851–1923)

Charles Frederick Frothingham (c. 1851 – May 17, 1923) was an American stockbroker and corporate director.

== Early life ==
Frothingham was born in Albany, New York in about 1851 and was educated at the Albany Academy. He was a son of Charles Frothingham (1816–1895) and Catharine Tremper (née Van Steenbergh) Frothingham (1818–1902), a daughter of John R. Van Steenburgh. Among his siblings were Anna Frothingham and Elizabeth Frothingham (the wife of Charles Whitehead).

== Career ==
At eighteen years old, he moved from Albany to New York City. He later became a member of the New York Stock Exchange on January 25, 1877, holding his seat for about thirty years before his retirement. In 1885, Frothingham headed a committee of "dissatisfied stockholders" of the Broadway and Seventh Avenue Railroad Company which hired Elihu Root as its counsel to investigate the affairs of the company. His firm was known as C. F. Frothingham & Co.; the firm of Delafield & Frothingham was dissolved in 1931. He was a friend of many prominent men on Wall Street, including Alexander Henriques.

He served as vice president of the board of directors of the American Rice Company (incorporated in Louisiana), and president of the board of directors of the North American Rice Company (incorporated in West Virginia).

== Personal life ==
Frothingham was married to Mary M. MacDonald (1860–1926) of Albany. Their surviving children were one son and three daughters:

- Mary Frothingham (1884–1976), who married Russian Count Alexander Golenischeff Koulouzoff Tolstoy, a nephew of writer Leo Tolstoy, in 1910.
- Charles Frederick Frothingham Jr. (1888–1963), a stockbroker who married Wilfreda (née Mortimer) Rutherfurd, the daughter of Richard Mortimer and former wife of John Morris Livingston Rutherfurd, (Note: John Morris Livingston Rutherfurd (1888–1971) was a descendant of U.S. Senator John Rutherfurd and signer of the Declaration of Independence Lewis Morris. They divorced in Paris in 1923.) in November 1924.
- Dorothy Frothingham (1895–1986), who married Edward William Cameron Arnold of the Arnold Constable & Company family, in 1909. They divorced and she married George Barnard Wagstaff, a son of Alfred Wagstaff Jr., in 1921. They also divorced.
- Isabelle Frothingham, who married stockbroker Robert Weaver Zimmerman.

He was a member of the Union League Club, the Sons of the Revolution and the Holland Lodge.

Frothingham died suddenly of angina pectoris at his home, 62 West 58th Street in Manhattan, on May 17, 1923. He was buried at Albany Rural Cemetery in Menands, New York.
