= Julliard =

Julliard may refer to:

- Alexandre Julliard, computer programmer who leads the Wine project
- Bruno Julliard, former chairman of the French student union Union Nationale des Étudiants de France
- Jean-François Julliard, Secretary General of Reporters Without Borders
- Éditions Julliard, French publishing house founded in 1942 by René Julliard
- The Jean Julliard Prize, a scientific prize awarded by the International Society of Blood Transfusion

== See also ==
- Juilliard (disambiguation)
