= John Jay Mortimer =

American financier (1935–2013)

- Born: October 11, 1935; New York City, U.S.
- Died: September 23, 2013 (aged 77); Tuxedo Park, New York, U.S.
- Resting place: St. Mary's-in-Tuxedo Episcopal Church Cemetery, Tuxedo Park, New York, U.S.
- Education: St. Mark's School
- Spouse: Senga Clark Mucci Davis
- Children: 2 (incl. Minnie)
- Relatives: Stanley G. Mortimer Jr. (brother); Richard Mortimer (grandfather); Henry Morgan Tilford (grandfather)

John Jay Mortimer (October 11, 1935 – September 23, 2013) was an American financier and member of the prominent Mortimer family of New York.

== Early life ==
He was one of six children born to Stanley Grafton Mortimer, Sr. (1890–1947) and Kathleen Hunt Tilford (1890–1970). His father was a stockbroker and U.S. amateur court tennis champion. His siblings included Stanley G. Mortimer Jr. (1913–1999), who was married to Babe Paley (1915-1978) and then Kathleen H. Harriman (1917-2011), the daughter of W. Averell Harriman, Henry Tilford Mortimer (1916-1993), Richard Mortimer, Eve Mortimer (1918-2007), who married Clarence Pell, Jr. and later Lewis Cass Ledyard III (1911-1990). His youngest sister, Katharine Mortimer (1923–2003), was married three times, including to Francis Xavier Shields, who became the grandfather of actress Brooke Shields.

He was a member of the prominent Standard Oil family, Mortimer is the maternal grandson of its president Henry Morgan Tilford. His paternal grandfather was Richard Mortimer, a real estate investor and member of Ward McAllister's "Four Hundred", purported to be an index of New York's best families. Through his father and paternal grandmother, Eleanor Jay Chapman Mortimer, she was a descendant of the first chief justice of the U.S. Supreme Court, John Jay, as well as the first colonial Governor of New York, Robert Livingston

== Life ==
Mortimer grew up at Keewaydin in Tuxedo Park. The family home was designed by Stanford White and once belonged to Pierre Lorillard III. His family, along with the Lorillards, were the founding families of Tuxedo Park. His grandmother, the widow of Henry Morgan Tilford, was known as "one of the reigning dowagers of Tuxedo Park" for four decades. According to author Sally Bedell Smith, "her annual debutante dinners before the Autumn Ball determined which young women were approved for New York society."

He attended Buckley School and was educated at St. Mark's School in Southborough, Massachusetts.

Mortimer was a financier in New York.

== Personal life ==
Mortimer was married to Senga Clark (née Mucci) Mortimer, an editor at House Beautiful magazine. Senga, the daughter of Col. Henry Mucci (1909–1997), was previously married and had a son, Dwight F. "Peter" Davis IV, from that marriage to Dwight Davis III, a grandson of Dwight F. Davis, the U.S. Secretary of War. Together, they were the parents of:

- Robert Livingston "Topper" Mortimer (b. 1975), who married, and later divorced, Tinsley Randolph Mercer (b. 1975). In 2018 he married Tabitha Simmons.
- Marian Fountain "Minnie" Mortimer (b. 1980), who married Stephen Gaghan, an Oscar-winning filmmaker, in 2007.

Mortimer died in 2013. His funeral was held in Tuxedo Park, and speakers included his son and daughter, and Lewis Lapham, the editor.
