= Minnie Mortimer =

American fashion designer (born 1980)

- Born: Marian Fountain Mortimer; April 30, 1980 (age 46); New York City, U.S.
- Education: The Brearley School; Convent of the Sacred Heart; St. Marks School
- Occupations: Fashion designer, socialite
- Spouse: Stephen Gaghan (m. 2007)
- Children: 2
- Parent(s): John Jay Mortimer; Senga Mortimer

Marian Fountain "Minnie" Mortimer (born April 30, 1980) is an American fashion designer and socialite.

== Early life ==
Born on Manhattan's Upper East side, Mortimer is the daughter of Senga Clark Mucci Davis and financier John Jay Mortimer, and the granddaughter of U.S. army colonel Henry Mucci. She was raised between Manhattan, Palm Beach and Southampton. She attended The Brearley School, Indian Mountain School, the Convent of the Sacred Heart, and St. Marks School, a boarding school in Southborough, Massachusetts. Mortimer studied photography in New York and worked with photographer Oberto Gili. A member of the prominent Standard Oil family, Mortimer is the great-granddaughter of its president Henry Morgan Tilford. She is the daughter of Senga Mortimer, an editor at House Beautiful magazine, and John Jay Mortimer, a direct descendant of John Jay, the first Chief Justice of the United States.

== Career ==
In 2009, Mortimer launched an eponymous woman's sportswear line with a feature in Vogue. Her designs have been featured in Marie Clair, InStyle, Elle, Vogue Nippon, Teen Vogue, Paper Magazine, The New York Times, Cosmopolitan, The Wall Street Journal, as well as others. She designed an exclusive collection for the W Hotels Global Glam line in the Fall of 2010. In the Spring of 2013, Mortimer designed a capsule collection for Three Dots U.S. and Three Dots Japan under the joint label "Minnie Mortimer for Three Dots." Mortimer frequently collaborates with and consults for the American heritage brand Boast USA producing several pieces under the label "Minnie Mortimer X Boast USA".

In addition to working as a designer and stylist Mortimer has appeared in the print and video advertising campaigns for Hogan and Ferragamo. She also appeared as herself in the WB show Gossip Girl.

== Personal life ==
On May 19, 2007, she married the American Oscar and Emmy-winning filmmaker Stephen Gaghan. They have two children.

In 2014, they listed their Brentwood home for sale for $4.995 million. In 2016, they were living in Pacific Palisades.
