= Mortimer Building =

Former building in New York City's Financial District

Coordinates: 40.707311°N 74.011221°W

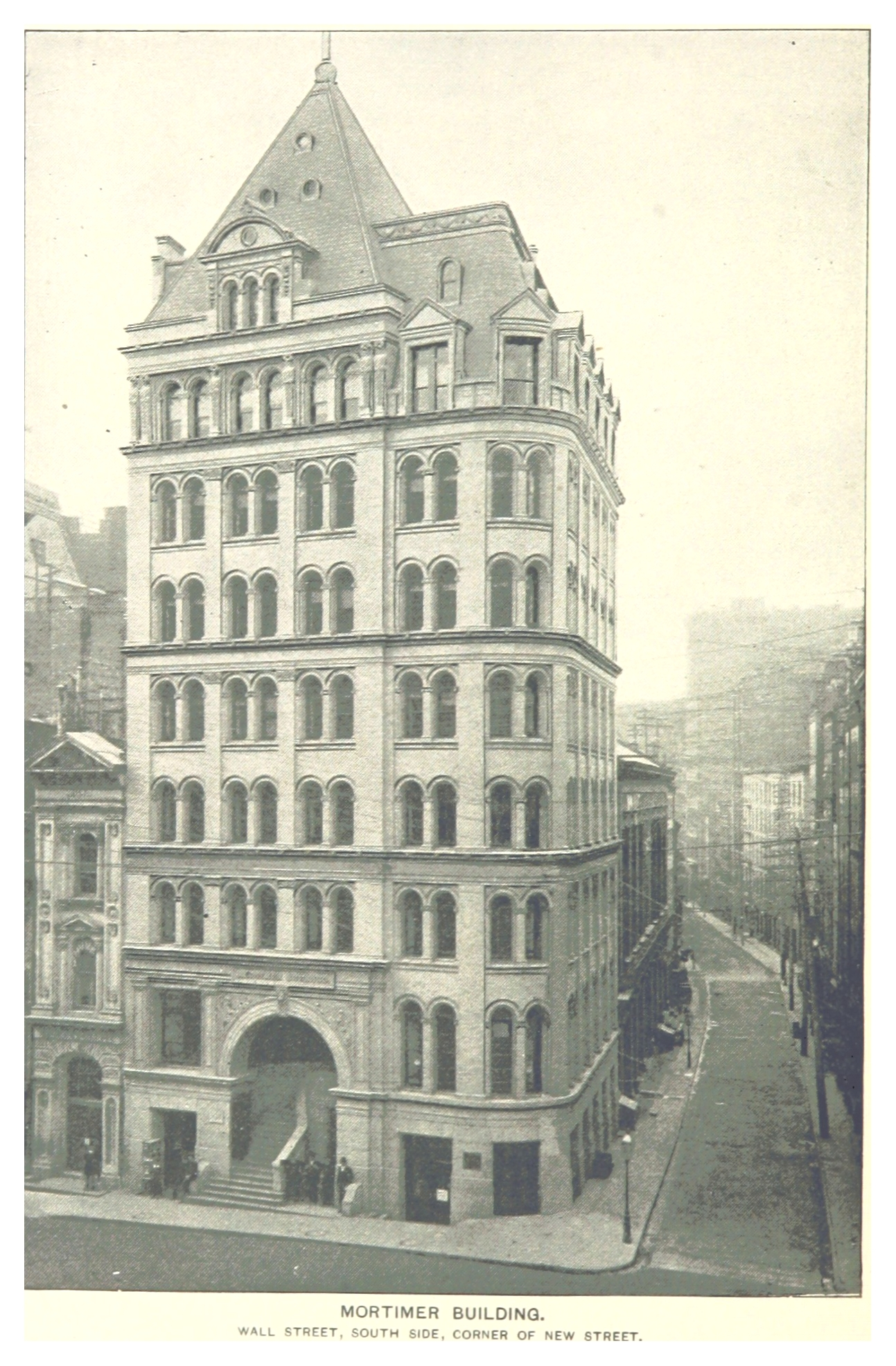

The Mortimer Building was a 19th-century building located at Wall Street and New Street in the Financial District of Manhattan, New York City. It was built by W.Y. Mortimer beginning on June 1, 1884, and completed for occupancy in March 1885. The architect was George B. Post. It fronted Wall Street for a distance of 57 feet (17 m) and New Street for 65 feet (20 m). Used entirely as an office building, the structure adjoined the New York Stock Exchange Building on the west and south. Tenants included lawyers, brokers, and bankers. The building was used as the general headquarters of the Industrial Workers of the World at its peak between 1912 and 1917.

The New York Stock Exchange acquired the Mortimer Building for $745,000 in December 1918. Reasons for the acquisition included consolidating all the adjuncts of the exchange beneath one roof and the necessity for additional floor space for foreign issues, entertained by the NYSE. The site was valued at $710,000 in February 1920; $745,000 with the building included.

== Interior design and history ==
Its rooms were light, arranged in suites and singly. The walls were made primarily of mahogany. The halls were wainscoted in marble and mahogany. The stairways were composed of iron and stone. The structure was considered fireproof from top to bottom. Modern conveniences included steam gas, electric lights, and two speedy elevators.

== Previous structures ==
The 1884 Mortimer Building replaced an earlier edifice with the same name, built in 1835 by Richard Mortimer (1790 - 1882). The latter structure was constructed in accordance with the Mortimer estate, William Yates Mortimer executor.

Richard Mortimer had commissioned another Mortimer Building at 935-939 Broadway from architect Griffith Thomas. This 1862 structure, which held the early offices of the American Institute of Architects, still stands as of 2018.
