= Stanley G. Mortimer Jr. =

American sportsman and executive (1913–1999)

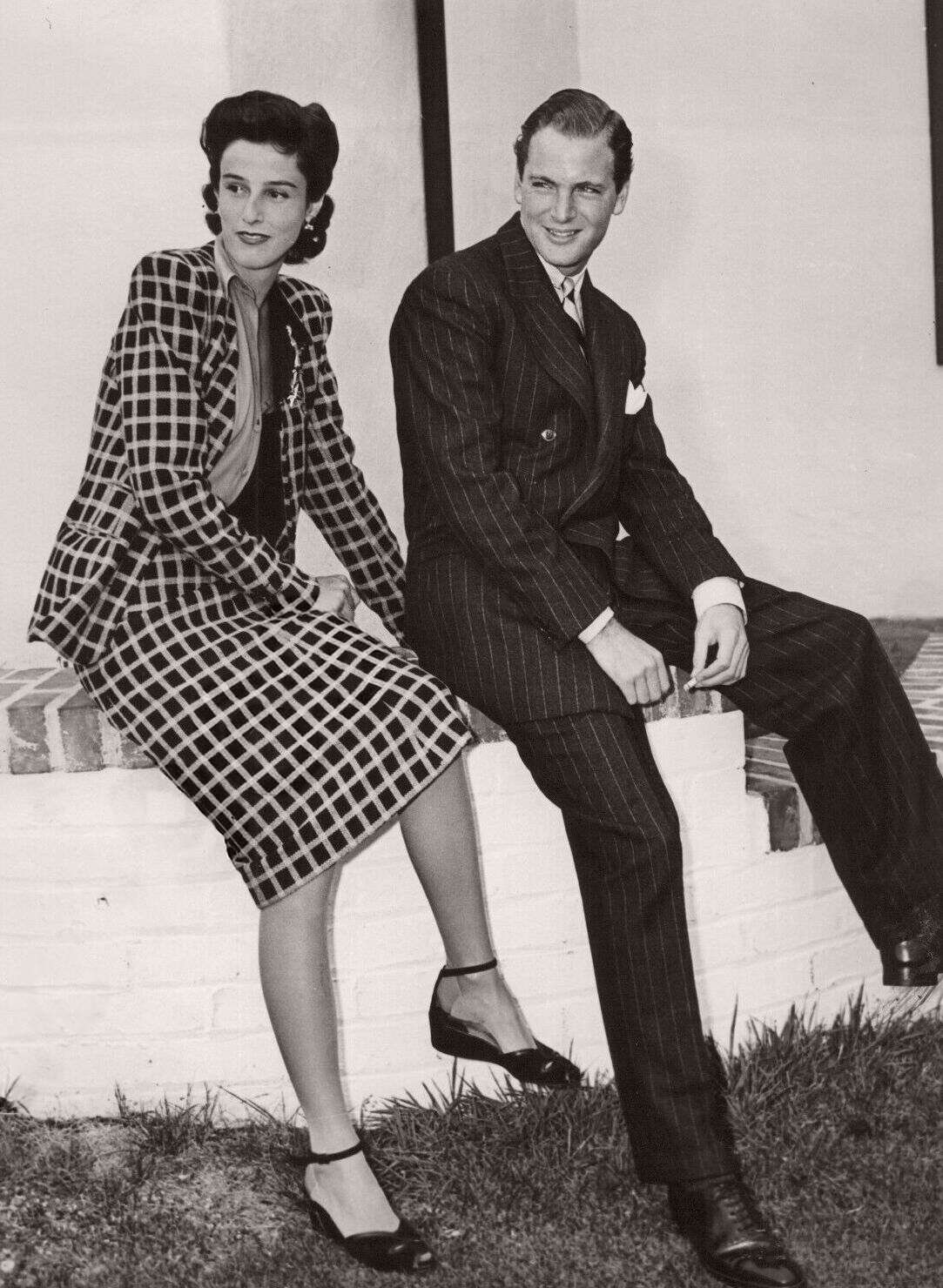
- Mortimer with Barbara Cushing in 1940
- Born: Stanley Grafton Mortimer Jr. May 12, 1913; Tuxedo Park, New York, U.S.
- Died: August 11, 1999 (aged 86); Harriman, New York, U.S.
- Education: St. Mark's School
- Alma mater: Harvard University
- Occupation: Advertising executive
- Spouses: Barbara Cushing (m. 1940; div. 1946) Kathleen Harriman Mortimer (m. 1947)
- Children: 5, including Amanda Burden
- Relatives: John Jay Mortimer (brother); Richard Mortimer (grandfather); Henry Morgan Tilford (grandfather)

Stanley Grafton Mortimer Jr. (May 12, 1913 – August 11, 1999) was an American sportsman and advertising executive.

== Early life ==
Mortimer was born Stanley Grafton Mortimer Jr. in Tuxedo, New York, on May 12, 1913. He was the eldest of six children born to Stanley Grafton Mortimer Sr. (1890–1947) and Kathleen Hunt (nee Tilford) Mortimer (1890–1970). His father was a stockbroker and U.S. amateur court tennis champion. His siblings included Henry Tilford Mortimer, Richard Mortimer; John Jay Mortimer; and Eve Mortimer (who married Clarence Pell Jr. and, later, Lewis Cass Ledyard III). His youngest sister, Katharine Mortimer, was married three times, including to Francis Xavier Shields (the grandfather of actress Brooke Shields).

His paternal grandfather was Richard Mortimer, a real estate investor and member of Ward McAllister's "Four Hundred", purported to be an index of New York's best families. Through his father and paternal grandmother, Eleanor Jay Chapman Mortimer, he was a descendant of the first chief justice of the U.S. Supreme Court, John Jay, as well as the first colonial Governor of New York, Robert Livingston

Mortimer grew up at Keewaydin, the family home in Tuxedo Park designed by Stanford White for Pierre Lorillard III. His family, along with the Lorillards, were the founding families of Tuxedo Park. His maternal grandfather was Henry Morgan Tilford, a Standard Oil founder. His maternal grandmother was known as "one of the reigning dowagers of Tuxedo Park" for four decades. According to author Sally Bedell Smith, "her annual debutante dinners before the Autumn Ball determined which young women were approved for New York society."

== Education and career ==
He was educated at St. Mark's School in Southborough, Massachusetts, and then Harvard University, where he graduated in 1936.

From 1942 to 1945, during World War II, he served in the Pacific Ocean theater, rising to Lieutenant commander in the U.S. Navy.

Mortimer worked as a director of advertising for Trans World Airlines and Pan American World Airways.

=== Sporting and club life ===
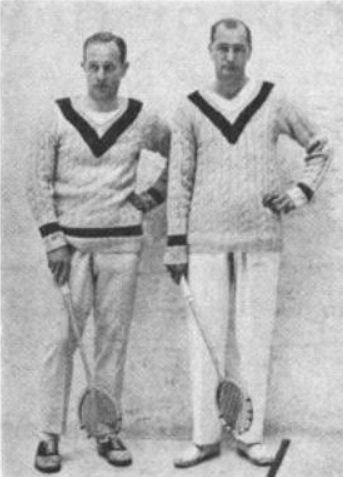
Mortimer (right) with racquets doubles partner Clarence C. Pell Jr.

A renowned sportsman, Mortimer was a member of the Jockey Club, and his racing stable at Keewaydin was successful in France for many years. He also was an avid tennis player (a member of the Racquet and Tennis Club in New York) and golfer (a member of the National Golf Links in Southampton) who took part in hunting-dog field trials. He was also a member and governor of the Tuxedo Club.

== Personal life ==
In 1940, Mortimer was married to Barbara "Babe" Cushing (1915–1978) at St. Luke's Episcopal Church in East Hampton, New York. Babe was the daughter of Dr. Harvey Cushing. Together, with her older sisters, she was part of the "fabulous Cushing sisters." Her sister Minnie Cushing was the second wife of Vincent Astor, and another sister, Betsey Cushing married James Roosevelt (the son of President Franklin D. Roosevelt), and later John Hay Whitney. Before their divorce in 1946, Babe and Stanley were the parents of two children:

- Stanley Grafton Mortimer III (b. 1942), a Harvard graduate who married Siri Aagot Larsen in 1971.
- Amanda Jay Mortimer (b. 1944), who married Carter Burden Jr., a Vanderbilt descendant, in 1964. They divorced in 1972 and she married Steven Ross, the CEO of Time Warner, in 1979. In 1981, they also divorced.

After their divorce, Babe married William S. Paley, the longtime head of CBS. In 1947, Mortimer remarried to Kathleen Lanier Harriman (1917–2011), the daughter of W. Averell Harriman (U.S. Ambassador to Russia and the U.K., a governor of New York and a U.S. Secretary of Commerce under President Harry S. Truman) and a granddaughter of railroad tycoon E. H. Harriman. Together, they had a home in Harriman and an apartment at 149 East 73rd Street in Manhattan, and were the parents of three children:

- David Harriman Mortimer (b. 1948)
- Jay Lawrance Mortimer (b. c. 1950), who married Prudence Bach in 1986.
- Averell Harriman Mortimer (b. c. 1956), who married Gigi H. Newhard in 1988.

In 1969, Mortimer, who suffered from manic-depression, shot himself in what may have been a suicide attempt, but survived. Mortimer died on August 11, 1999, at his home in Harriman, New York.
