= Wayne Andrews (historian) =

American historian and architectural photographer

- Born: September 5, 1913; Kenilworth, Illinois, U.S.
- Died: August 17, 1987; Paris, France
- Spouse: Elizabeth
- Children: 1

Wayne Andrews (September 5, 1913 – August 17, 1987) was an American historian and architectural photographer. He was the author of numerous books, including Battle for Chicago, and Siegfried`s Curse: The German Journey from Nietzsche to Hesse.

== Early life and education ==
Born in Kenilworth, Illinois, Andrews attended the Lawrenceville School in New Jersey before reading for a degree at Harvard University, graduating in 1936. He was awarded a PhD in American history from Columbia University in 1956 with a doctoral thesis entitled Architecture, Ambition and Americans.

== Career ==
Andrews was Curator of Manuscripts at the New-York Historical Society from 1948 to 1956 and an editor at Charles Scribner's Sons (1956–1963). He held the first American art history chair established at an American university as Archives of American Art Professor at Wayne State University, Detroit from 1964 to 1983. He was a former president of the New York chapter of the Society of Architectural Historians.

Andrews took photographs all over America and on his travels to Europe and other parts of the world for his many books. When his book Architecture in America: A Photographic History from the Colonial Period to the Present was first published in 1960 the description read “Wayne Andrews is a writer who thirty-six years ago began wondering what American architecture looked like. Since that time he and his camera have explored forty-five states and the District of Columbia…No other photographer has succeeded in documenting so many phases of our architecture from century to century and from coast to coast…”. Architectural historian Carl Condit once commented, ''Mr. Andrews’ photographic talents are always equal to his task. . . Andrews’ art is superb.” His main portfolio consisting of 4,183 architectural photographs, mostly from America and Europe, and a small number from Mexico is held by the University of California, Santa Barbara in their Special Research Collections. The Alexander Architectural Archives of the University of Texas at Austin also holds photographs by Andrews as does the Conway Library at The Courtauld Institute of Art in London and the Department of Image Collections at the National Gallery of Art, Washington D.C.

== Private life ==
When he retired Andrews returned to Chicago where he lived for the remainder of his life with his wife Elizabeth. The couple had one daughter, Elizabeth (Lisa) Waties. He died of a heart attack on August 17, 1987, while in Paris taking photos for his next book.

== Selected publications ==
- Architecture in New York: A Photographic History, Syracuse, N.Y. : Syracuse University Press, 1995, originally published by Atheneum in 1969, ISBN 0-8156-0309-6
- The Surrealist Parade, New York, N.Y. : New Directions, 1990, ISBN 0-8112-1126-6
- Architecture in Michigan, Detroit : Wayne State University Press, 1982, ISBN 0-8143-1718-9
- Pride of the South: A Social History of Southern Architecture, New York : Atheneum, 1979, ISBN 0-689-10931-8
- Architecture, Ambition and Americans: A Social History of American Architecture, New York : Free Press; London : Collier Macmillan, 1978, ISBN 0-02-900770-4
- Architecture in America: A Photographic History from the Colonial Period to the Present, New York : Atheneum, 1977, ISBN 0-689-70549-2
- American Gothic: Its origins, Its trials, Its triumphs, New York : Random House, 1975, ISBN 0-394-49760-0
- Architecture in New England: A Photographic History, Brattleboro, Vt. : S. Greene Press, 1973, ISBN 0-8289-0178-3
- Germaine: A Portrait of Madame de Stael, Gollancz, 1964
