= Frederic Augustus Juilliard =

American businessman (1868–1937)

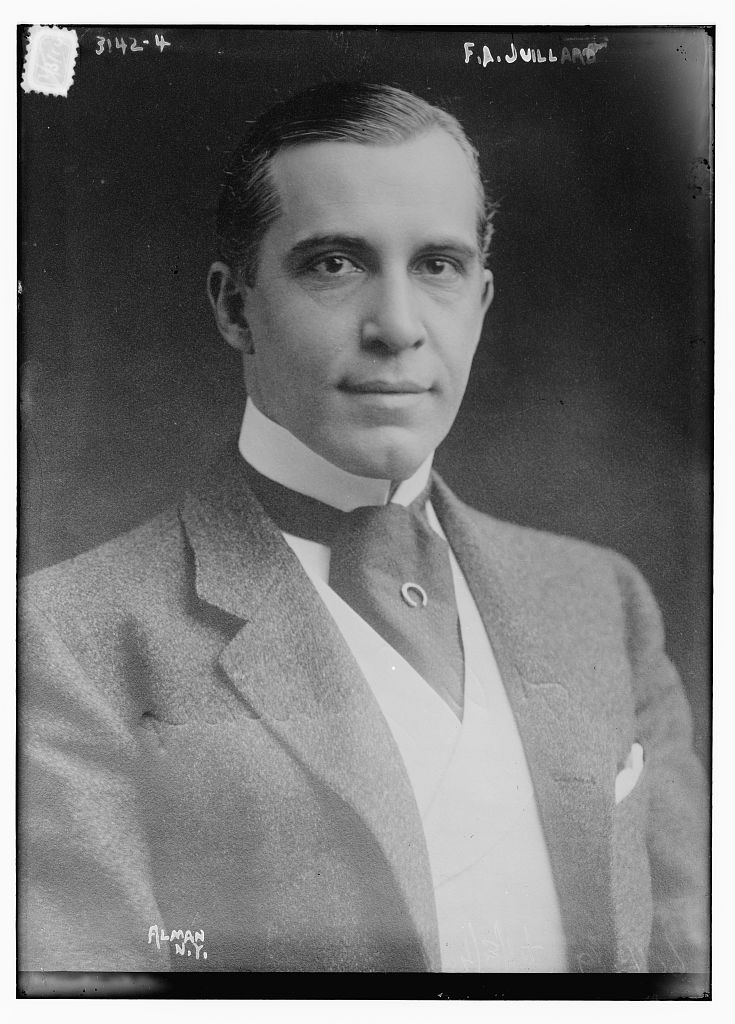

Frederic Augustus Juilliard (May 16, 1868 – June 29, 1937) was the nephew and heir of Augustus D. Juilliard; he took over the Augustus D. Juilliard Company in 1919 at the death of his uncle, Augustus D. Juilliard.

== Biography ==
He was born on 16 May 1868 to Charles Frederic Juilliard and his wife in San Leandro, California. His father's parents were immigrants from France. His paternal uncle was Augustus D. Juilliard, who from 1866 lived in New York City and worked in textile manufacturing and distribution. A successful investor in banks, railroads and industry, he also became a patron of the arts.

The younger Juilliard went into business with his uncle and was designated as his heir. Much of his uncle's estate was devoted to philanthropy, especially a major bequest to advance music in the United States, leading to the founding of The Juilliard School in 1924 in New York. The younger Juilliard was also a patron of music.

After his uncle's death in 1919, Juilliard took over management of the Augustus D. Juilliard Company. He died on June 29, 1937, at his home in Tuxedo Park, New York. He was buried at the St. Mary's-in-Tuxedo Episcopal Church Cemetery.
