= Henry Morgan Tilford =

American oilman (1856–1919)

- Born: June 14, 1856; Lexington, Kentucky, U.S.
- Died: December 3, 1919 (aged 63); New York City, U.S.
- Resting place: St. Mary's-in-Tuxedo Episcopal Church Cemetery, Tuxedo Park, New York, U.S.
- Other name: Henry M. Tilford
- Spouse: Isabelle Weart Giles (m. 1885)
- Children: 3
- Relatives: John Jay Mortimer (grandson); Stanley G. Mortimer Jr. (grandson)

Henry Morgan Tilford (June 14, 1856 – December 3, 1919) was an American oilman. Tilford served as president of the Continental Oil Company from 1893 to 1907, and as president of Standard Oil of California from 1900 to 1911.

== Early life ==
Tilford was born in Lexington, Kentucky on June 14, 1856. He was the son of Catherine Hunt (née Curd) Tilford (1824–1908) and John Boyle Tilford (1812–1878), a banker and founder of the First National Bank of Lexington. His siblings included Richard Curd Tilford, Mary Jane (née Tilford) Chastain, Wesley Hunt Tilford, Edward Alfred Tilford, and Frank Vincit Tilford.

As a child, his family home was next door to the home of Henry Clay and John Hunt Morgan, and Henry obtained his early education in the South and then moved north to New York City with his father and brothers.

== Career ==
With Jabez A. Bostwick, Tilford founded Bostwick & Tilford, a company that owned barges, lighters and a large refinery on the East River with headquarters at 138 Pearl Street in Manhattan. It was eventually acquired by John D. Rockefeller's Standard Oil company in 1887. After the merger, Tilford headed up Standard's operations on the West Coast, known as Pacific Coast Oil Company, which later became Standard Oil of California (and today is known as Chevron). Upon his return to the New York, the Tilfords purchased the Henry William Poor mansion at Tuxedo Park designed by T. Henry Randall and he served various Standard Oil companies, including as president of Central Oil Company of Denver, president of the Standard Oil of Ohio, vice president of the Standard Oil Company of New York, and a "director in nearly all of the subsidiaries of the parent organization." By 1907, Tilford owned 6,000 shares.

Tilford retired in the Spring of 1911, however, in 1917, he joined the company's board of directors following the death of John Dustin Archbold in 1916. Two years later, Tilford was succeeded by Walter C. Teagle, who served as president of Standard Oil of New Jersey from 1917 until 1937. At the time of his death, he was associated with the National Fuel Gas Company.

== Personal life ==
The Tilford mansion in Tuxedo Park, 1903.

On November 12, 1885, Tilford was married to Isabelle Weart Giles (1856–1941). Isabelle was the daughter of John Chrystie Giles and Isabella Lee (née Weart) Giles. Together, they were the parents of:

- Isabelle Tilford (1887–1956), who married David Wagstaff (1882–1951), the son of Alfred Wagstaff Jr. and a Harvard graduate who was a member of the investment and merchant banking firm, Dominick & Dominick.
- Katherine Hunt Tilford (1890–1970), who married Stanley Grafton Mortimer (1890–1947), a son of Richard Mortimer, in 1910.
- Annette Tilford (1900–1946), who married Amory Lawrence Haskell (1893–1966) in September 1923.

Tilford died on December 3, 1919, at the age of 63 at his home, 24 West 52nd Street in Manhattan. He was buried at St. Mary's Church Cemetery in Tuxedo Park, New York. His estate was valued at over $20,000,000 and he left approximately $17,000,000 to his family. In his will, he created trusts for each of his daughters where they received income from the trust until age 48 at which point they received the principal.

After his death, his widow, who at $5,000,000 in 1920 had "the largest personal possessions among New Yorkers", remained socially prominent in Tuxedo Park and Palm Springs. She was known as "one of the reigning dowagers of Tuxedo Park" for four decades. According to author Sally Bedell Smith, "her annual debutante dinners before the Autumn Ball determined which young women were approved for New York society." Mrs. Tilford, who gave up her New York townhouse to live at the Waldorf-Astoria Hotel, died at Woodland, her Tuxedo estate in 1941.

=== Descendants ===
Through his daughter Isabelle, he was the grandfather of Hunt Tilford Wagstaff (1909–1971) and David Wagstaff (1910–1984).

Through his daughter Katherine, he was the grandfather of Stanley G. Mortimer Jr. (1913–1999), who was married to Babe Paley, and then Kathleen Harriman; Henry Tilford Mortimer (1916–1993), Richard Mortimer, Eve Mortimer (1918–2007), who married Clarence Pell Jr., and later Lewis Cass Ledyard III; Katharine Mortimer (1923–2003), who married three times (including to Francis Xavier Shields and becoming grandmother of actress Brooke Shields); and John Jay Mortimer (1935–2013), a prominent financier.

Through his daughter Annette, he was the grandfather of Anne (née Haskell) Ellis (1924–2006); Margaret Riker (née Haskell) Ross (1925–1999), whose family home, the Boudinot–Southard Farmstead, was located next to Lord Stirling Park; Amory Lawrence Haskell Jr. (1928–1970) Isabelle (née Haskell) de Tomaso (1930-), and Hope (née Haskell) Jones (1934).

== In popular culture ==
Tilford was reportedly the basis for the 2007 American drama film, There Will Be Blood, written and directed by Paul Thomas Anderson and starring Daniel Day-Lewis and Paul Dano. The film was inspired by Upton Sinclair's novel Oil! and tells the story of a silver miner-turned-oilman on a ruthless quest for wealth during Southern California's oil boom of the late 19th and early 20th centuries. A fictionalized version of Tilford himself is portrayed in the film by David Warshofsky.
