= Stephen Gaghan =

American screenwriter and director (born 1965)

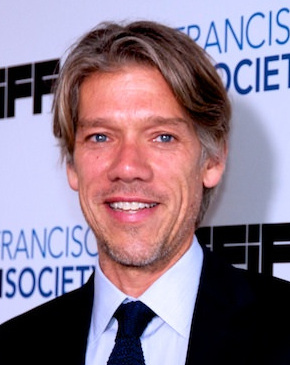
- Gaghan at the 2014 San Francisco International Film Festival
- Born: May 6, 1965 (age 61); Louisville, Kentucky, U.S.
- Education: Babson College (B.A.)
- Occupations: Film director; screenwriter
- Years active: 1995–present
- Spouse: Minnie Mortimer (m. 2007)
- Children: 4

Stephen Gaghan (/ˈɡeɪɡən/ GAY-gən; born May 6, 1965) is an American screenwriter and director. He is noted for writing the screenplay for Steven Soderbergh's film Traffic, based on a Channel 4 series, for which he won the Academy Award for Best Adapted Screenplay, as well as Syriana which he wrote and directed. He wrote and directed the thriller Abandon and Dolittle, a family film, in addition to directing the drama Gold.

== Early life and education ==
Gaghan was born in Louisville, Kentucky, the son of the former Elizabeth Jane Whorton and her first husband, Stephen Gaghan (d. 1980), and a stepson of Tom Haag. He is a grandson of Jerry Gaghan, a newspaper columnist and drama critic for Variety and the Philadelphia Daily News. He wrote in a 2001 article in Newsweek, "I also wanted to be a writer, like my grandfather, who carried a card in his wallet that read, "If you find me, call my son [my father] at this number."

In his final days of high school before graduation, Gaghan was expelled for driving a go-kart through the halls of the school. During the release of Traffic, a critic commented on one of the teen characters in the movie who is a drug addict and a straight-A student, calling it unrealistic, which Gaghan defended, saying that he had straight A's while he was addicted to drugs and alcohol. As Gaghan wrote in an article published in Newsweek in February 2001, "I wasn't much different from my peers, except where they could stop drinking after three or six or 10 drinks, I couldn't stop and wouldn't stop until I had progressed through marijuana, cocaine, heroin and, finally, crack and freebase--which seem for so many people to be the last stop on the elevator." Gaghan said that he began dealing with his addictions in 1997. "Over one long, five-day weekend, I had three separate heroin dealers get arrested," he said. "My dealer, my backup dealer and my backup-backup dealer. I was left alone, and I just hit that place, that total incomprehensible demoralization. That was the end of it; up five days straight, locked in the bathroom, convinced there was nowhere else to go, I had to kill myself, I'm going to kill myself. I just couldn't take another minute of it."

He attended the University of Kentucky in Lexington and was a member of Delta Tau Delta fraternity. He was a student on the fall 1986 voyage of the Semester at Sea study abroad program, attending classes on board the SS Universe and sailed around the world. He eventually graduated from Babson College in Wellesley, Massachusetts in 1988 with a degree in screenwriting. He began a catalog company, Fallen Empire Inc., which he hoped would support his writing career.

== Career ==
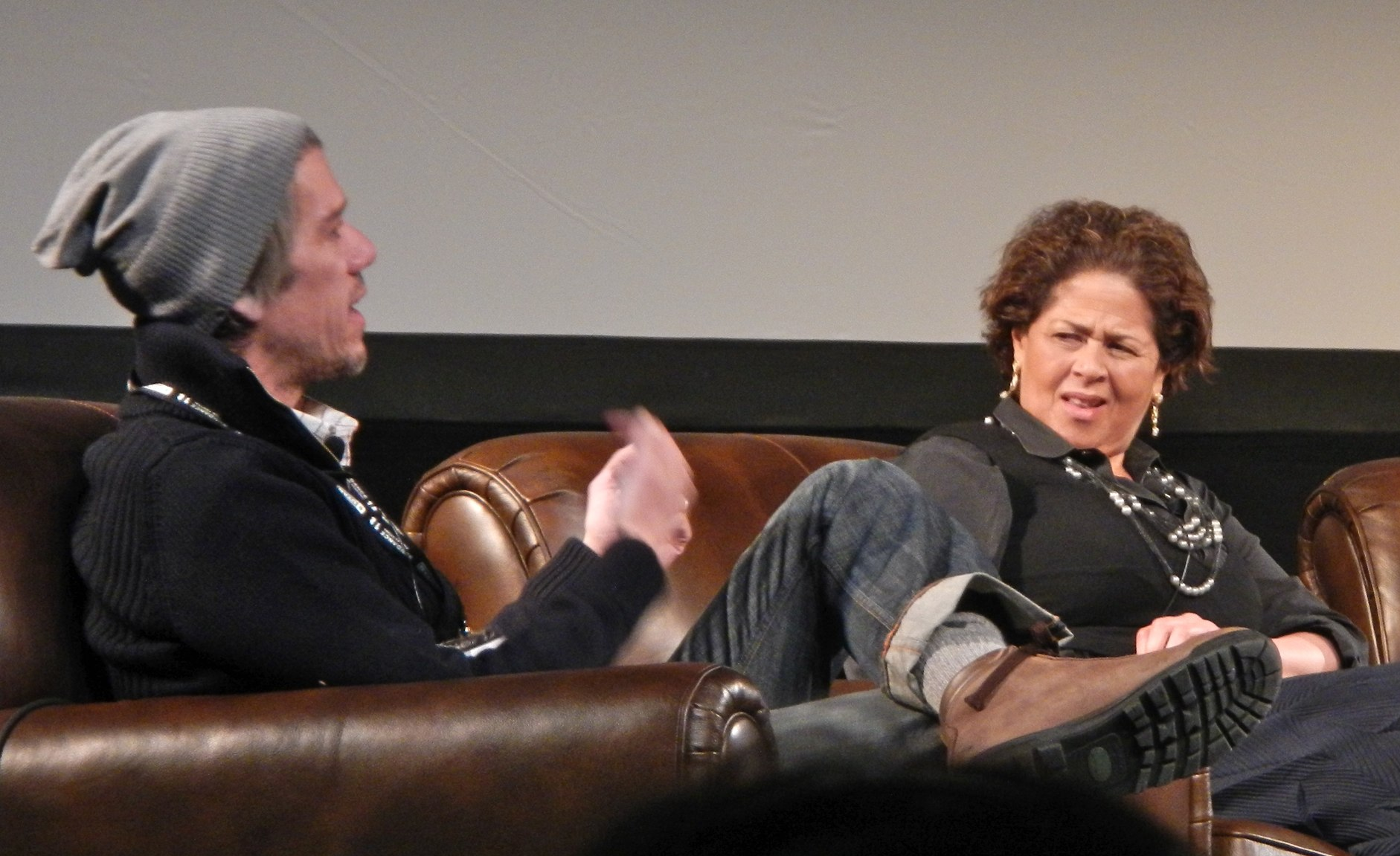
Gaghan and Anna Deavere Smith at the 2012 Sundance Film Festival

Gaghan wrote the screenplay for Traffic, for which he won an Academy Award for Best Adapted Screenplay in 2000. In addition to Traffic, Gaghan also directed and wrote the screenplays for Syriana (2005) and Abandon (2002); the former receiving comparable critical acclaim to Traffic, while the latter received negative reviews. Other writing credits include Rules of Engagement (2000), Havoc (2005), and The Alamo (2004), as well as a handful of episodes of various television series. Gaghan turned down the chance to adapt Dan Brown's novel, The Da Vinci Code. In television writing, he won an Emmy Award for co-writing a NYPD Blue episode entitled Where's Swaldo, in 1997. In addition to NYPD Blue, he has also written for The Practice and New York Undercover.

He was slated to direct a film adaptation of Malcolm Gladwell's book, Blink: The Power of Thinking Without Thinking. Gaghan has been hired by Warner Bros. to write the screenplay of the Dead Spy Running franchise written by author Jon Stock. Gaghan is also set to direct crime thriller Candy Store. On January 19, 2017, it was announced that Ubisoft had hired him to direct the film adaptation of the popular video game The Division, but it was announced later that Gaghan was no longer attached to the project.

== Personal life ==
Gaghan has a son, Gardner (b. 1999) and a daughter, Betsy (b. 2001), from a previous relationship with actress Michael McCraine. He met McCraine in 1997 while at a recovery meeting. On May 19, 2007, Gaghan and Marion "Minnie" Mortimer married; they have a daughter born in 2009 and a son born in 2014. Gaghan and Mortimer met at a pre-Oscars picnic after Gaghan watched her from a distance for two hours.

== Filmography ==
=== Film ===
Year	Title	Director	Writer
2000	Rules of Engagement	No	Yes
2000	Traffic	No	Yes
2002	Abandon	Yes	Yes
2004	The Alamo	No	Yes
2005	Havoc	No	Yes
2005	Syriana	Yes	Yes
2016	Gold	Yes	No
2020	Dolittle	Yes	Yes
2026	Billion Dollar Spy	No	Yes

Uncredited revisions

- I Still Know What You Did Last Summer (1998)
- Black Hawk Down (2001)
- Phone Booth (2002)
- After Earth (2013)

=== Television ===
Year	Title	Writer	Producer	Notes
1995	New York Undercover	Yes	No	Episode "CAT"
1995–1996	American Gothic	Yes	No	7 episodes
1996	NYPD Blue	Yes	No	Episode "Where's 'Swaldo"
1997	The Practice	Yes	No	Episodes "First Degree: Part 1" and "Sex, Lies, and Monkeys: Part 2"
1997	Sleepwalkers	Yes	Yes	Episode "Night Terrors"

=== Acting roles ===
Year	Title	Role	Notes
2004	Alfie	Adam	
2008	Entourage	Himself	Episode "Welcome to the Jungle"

=== Video games ===
- Call of Duty: Ghosts (2013)

=== Personal appearances ===
- Entourage
- The Henry Rollins Show
- Film '72
- Sunday Morning Shootout
- The Charlie Rose Show
- The Big Story
- HBO First Look
- Hollywood High (2003)
- 73rd Academy Awards
- Inside Traffic: The Making of Traffic

== Awards and nominations ==
Year	Title	Award/Nomination
1996	NYPD Blue	Primetime Emmy Award for Outstanding Writing for a Drama Series (For episode "Where's 'Swaldo")
2000	Traffic	Academy Award for Best Adapted Screenplay; BAFTA Award for Best Adapted Screenplay; Critics' Choice Movie Award for Best Adapted Screenplay; Edgar Award for Motion Picture Screenplay; Golden Globe Award for Best Screenplay; Writers Guild of America Award for Best Original Screenplay; Nominated – National Society of Film Critics Award for Best Screenplay; Nominated – Satellite Award for Best Adapted Screenplay
2005	Syriana	Edgar Award for Motion Picture Screenplay; Nominated – Academy Award for Best Original Screenplay; Nominated – Robert Award for Best American Film
2016	Gold	Nominated – Golden Globe Award for Best Original Song (For the song "Gold")
2020	Dolittle	Nominated – Golden Raspberry Award for Worst Director; Nominated – Golden Raspberry Award for Worst Screenplay
