= List of foreign correspondents in the Spanish Civil War =

The following list of foreign correspondents in the Spanish Civil War is an alphabetical list of the large number of journalists and photographers who were in Spain at some stage of the Spanish Civil War (1936–1939). It only includes those who were specifically accredited as such, as opposed to writers who later wrote of their experiences, including Gustav Regler, George Orwell, and so on.

Foreign press coverage of the war was extensive, with around a thousand foreign newspaper correspondents working from Spain.

Some journalists wrote for more than one newspaper and several papers had more than one journalist in Spain at the same time or at different times. In some cases, they were already seasoned war correspondents when they went to Spain. A few of them, such as Jay Allen, were already living in Spain when war broke out, and some of them, again like Allen, who wrote at various times for the Chicago Daily Tribune, News Chronicle, and The New York Times, wrote for more than one paper.

While some correspondents supported the rebel cause, most notably William Carney, Edward Knoblaugh]and H. R. Knickerbocker, according to the Hispanist Paul Preston, "The bulk of the reporters became so committed to the Republic, partly because of the horrible things they saw such as the bombing of civilians, but even more so because they felt that what was going on in Spain was everybody's fight."

A case in point was that of Louis Delaprée, a Catholic correspondent sent to cover the rebel zone for Paris-Soir, who was killed as a result of his plane being shot down on his way back to Paris, furious at his newspaper not publishing his articles, as it clearly considered the "massacre of a hundred Spanish children is less interesting than a sigh from Mrs Simpson."

Another, even more Catholic, correspondent was Noel Monks, an Australian journalist for the Daily Express, who had initially been sympathetic to Franco, wrote critically of the "so-called British experts" who would later visit Guernica and "deliver pompous judgements: 'Guernica was set on fire by the Reds,' My answer to them is unprintable... If the 'Reds' had destroyed Guernica, I for one could have blown the whole story... And how I would have blown it had it been true!"

== Journalists ==
=== A ===
- James Abbe
- Barbro Alving (Bang) – Dagens Nyheter
- Jay Allen – the Chicago Tribune and News Chronicle

=== B ===
- Sam Baron – Socialist Call
- Vernon Bartlett – News Chronicle
- Georges Berniard – Le Petit Gironde
- Daniel Berthet
- Burnett Bolloten – Associated Press or United Press
- Franz Borkenau – London Daily Express, Austrian journalist who went on to write The Spanish Cockpit
- Georges Botto – Havas Agency
- Rene Brut
- Henry Buckley – Daily Telegraph and the Observer
- M. J. Buckley – Cork Examiner

=== C ===
- Harold Cardozo – Daily Mail
- William P. Carney – was one of the New York Times correspondents reporting from the Nationalist side.
- Claud Cockburn (under the pseudonym Frank Pitcairn) – Daily Worker and The Week
- Mathieu Corman – Ce Soir
- Félix Correia – the Portuguese Diario de Lisboa
- Virginia Cowles – Hearst Publications
- Geoffrey Cox – News Chronicle and the Daily Express

=== D ===
- Marcel Dany
- Frances Davis – Chicago Daily News
- Louis Delaprée – Paris-Soir
- Sefton Delmer – London Daily Express
- Jean D’Hospital – Havas Agency
- Shiela Grant Duff – Chicago Daily News

=== F ===
- Ladislas Farago – New York Times
- Lawrence A. Fernsworth – New York Times. He also wrote for The Times and America
- Louis Fischer – New York's The Nation and London's New Statesman and Nation
- Lionel Fleming – Irish Times
- Charles Foltz – Associated Press
- William Forrest – Daily Express

=== G ===
- Gertrude Gaffney – Irish Independent
- O. D. Gallagher – London Daily Express
- Cecil Gerahty – Special Correspondent for the Daily Mail
- Martha Gellhorn – Collier's Weekly, accompanied by her future husband Ernest Hemingway
- Floyd Gibbons – International News Service
- Jędrzej Giertych - Kurjer Poznański
- Henry Tilton 'Hank' Gorrell – United Press
- Gerda Grepp – Arbeiderbladet
- Nordahl Grieg

=== H ===
- Frank Hanighen – the Daily Express
- Ernest Hemingway – North American Newspaper Alliance
- Pierre Héricourt – Action Française
- William Hillman – Hearst Press correspondent
- James Holburn – temporary correspondent for The Times with the Nationalist forces
- Christopher Holme – Reuters
- Langston Hughes reported from the Abraham Lincoln Brigade for the Baltimore Afro-American

=== J ===
- Frank Jellinek – Manchester Guardian
- Bradish Johnson – Newsweek and The Spur, killed by an exploding shell near Teruel,
- Bertrand de Jouvenel – Paris-Soir

=== K ===
- Peter Kerrigan – Daily Worker
- Frank L. Kluckhohn was one of the New York Times correspondents reporting from the Nationalist side.
- H. R. Knickerbocker (Pulitzer Prize-winner) – the Hearst Press correspondent
- H. Edward Knoblaugh – Associated Press
- Arthur Koestler – News Chronicle and Pester Lloyd
- Mikhail Koltsov for Pravda
- William Krehm — wrote for Workers Voice and Labor Front, author of Spain: Revolution and Counter-Revolution, aligned with the POUM

=== L ===
- John Langdon-Davies – News Chronicle
- Roman Lechter – Polish Naje Presse
- Lise Lindbæk – Dagbladet
- Rupert Lockwood was the accredited correspondent for the Melbourne Herald

=== M ===
- Gault MacGowan – New York Sun
- Henri Malet-Dauban Havas Agency
- Richard Massock – Associated Press
- Max Massot – Le Journal
- Herbert Matthews was the New York Times correspondent on the Republican side
- Francis McCullagh – Irish Independent
- Webb Miller – United Press
- James M. Minifie – New York Herald-Tribune
- Noel Monks – London Daily Express
- Indro Montanelli for Il Messaggero
- Alan Moorehead – London Daily Express
- Curio Mortari – La Stampa

=== N ===
- Edward J. (Eddie) Neil – Associated Press, killed by an exploding shell near Teruel, December 1937
- Mário Neves – the Portuguese Diario de Lisboa – Neves entered Badajoz after the fall of the city in the early morning of 15 August, together with Daniel Berthet and Marcel Dany.
- Robert Neville – the New York Herald-Tribune
- Joseph North – Daily Worker and New Masses
- Leopoldo Nunes – O Século

=== P ===
- Eleanor Packard – United Press
- Reynolds Packard – New York Herald-Tribune
- Irving Pflaum
- Kim Philby – The Times' accredited special correspondent with the Nationalist forces
- Percival Phillips– The Daily Telegraph
- Ksawery Pruszyński - Wiadomości Literackie

=== R ===
- Gustav Regler – Deutsche Zentral-Zeitung
- F. A. Rice – the Morning Post
- Karl Robson – Daily Express
- Edwin Rolfe – Daily Worker and New Masses
- Esmond Romilly – News Chronicle
- Kajsa Rothman – Karlstads-Tidningen

=== S ===
- Cedric Salter – Daily Telegraph, News Chronicle and Daily Mail
- Victor Schiff – Daily Herald
- K. Scott-Watson SEE Keith Scott Watson
- George Seldes – New York Post
- Ernest Sheepshanks – Reuters, killed by an exploding shell near Teruel,
- Alex Small – the Chicago Tribune
- Sidney Smith – Daily Express
- George Steer, of The Times witnessed and reported on the bombing of Guernica. Left to join The Daily Telegraph
- William F. Stirling was a temporary correspondent for The Times.
- Leland Stowe – Herald Tribune
- Joseph Swire
- Roland Strunk – Völkischer Beobachter
- Vratislav Šantroch – Rudé právo
- Szmul Sznejderman - Hajnt

=== T ===
- Nigel Tangye – the Evening News
- Edmond Taylor – Chicago Tribune
- Simone Téry - French journalist for Regards

=== V ===
- Ferenc Vajta

=== W ===
- Keith Scott Watson – Daily Herald and The Star
- Dennis Weaver – News Chronicle
- John T. Whitaker – New York Herald Tribune
- Karl H. Von Wiegand – International News Service
- Elizabeth Wilkinson – Daily Worker
- Tom Wintringham – the Daily Worker and Picture Post

=== Y ===
- Jan H. Yindrich United Press

=== Z ===
- Lester Ziffren – United Press

== Photographers ==
Photographers included Robert Capa, Gerda Taro (who died at Brunete in July 1937), David Seymour, Hans Namuth, and Georg Reisner. Major clients were photojournalistic magazines such as Vu, Life and Picture Post. Vu would be the first to publish Capa's famous photograph of Federico Borrell García, known as The Falling Soldier. Three boxes containing 4,500 lost negatives taken by Taro, Capa, and Seymour during the war were rediscovered in 2007. The documentary film The Mexican Suitcase (2011) tells the story of the negatives, which are currently housed at the International Center of Photography in New York.

== Incidents involving correspondents ==
- Gerda Taro dies on 26 July 1937, after an "accident" during the battle of Brunete, Spain
- In December 1937, near Teruel, a shell exploded just in front of the car in which Kim Philby, The Times' accredited special correspondent with the Nationalist forces, was travelling with the correspondents Edward J. (Eddie) Neil of Associated Press, Bradish Johnson of Newsweek, and Ernest Sheepshanks of Reuters. While Philby suffered only a minor head wound, Johnson was killed outright, and Neil and Sheepshanks soon died of their wounds.
