= Robert Neville =

Robert Neville may refer to:

- Robert Neville (bishop) (1404–1457), English bishop
- Robert Neville (journalist) (1905–1970), American war correspondent
- Robert Neville (Royal Marines officer) (1896–1987), Royal Marines officer and Governor of the Bahamas
- Robert Cummings Neville (born 1939), theologian-philosopher
- Robert Neville (politician), MP for Yorkshire
- Robert Neville (character), the protagonist of the science-fiction horror novel I Am Legend and its various film adaptations

== See also ==
- Robert Nevil, musician
- Robert de Neville (died 1282), English nobleman
