= Lyman Kirkpatrick =

American intelligence officer, academic and author (1916–1995)

Lyman Bickford Kirkpatrick Jr. (July 15, 1916 – March 3, 1995) was an American intelligence officer, academic and author who served as inspector general and executive director of the Central Intelligence Agency. He also served as a professor at Brown University. He wrote a number of books about intelligence after his retirement.

== Early life ==
Kirkpatrick was born in Rochester, New York. His elder sister was the journalist Helen Kirkpatrick. He attended Deerfield Academy in Deerfield, Massachusetts, and graduated from Princeton University's School of Public and International Affairs in 1938 with a degree in political science.

== Career ==
After leaving Princeton, Kirkpatrick worked on the editorial staff of U.S. News & World Report until enlisting in the Office of the Coordinator of Information, which later evolved into the Office of Strategic Services, in 1942. Based in London, Kirkpatrick served as a liaison with British, French, Norwegian, Czech, and Polish intelligence services. In 1943, he was commissioned as a lieutenant in the U.S. Army, where he served as the intelligence briefing officer for General Omar Bradley, a post he retained until the end of the war.

After a brief return to U.S. News & World Report, Kirkpatrick joined the Central Intelligence Agency (CIA) when the agency was created in 1947. He served as a division chief, deputy assistant director of operations, and executive assistant to Director of Central Intelligence Walter Bedell Smith, and appeared to be well positioned for a leadership role in the organization when he contracted polio during a 1952 trip to Asia on agency business. He was left paralyzed from the waist down in 1953 and spent the rest of his career in a wheelchair.

After Kirkpatrick returned from hospitalization, Director of Central Intelligence Allen Dulles named him inspector general of the CIA, a post he held until 1961. Richard Helms, another intelligence officer, had been appointed director of covert operations, a job that Kirkpatrick had been expected to assume. As inspector general he traveled overseas on inspection tours, despite his wheelchair, and performed liaison work with the Federal Bureau of Investigation and the president's Foreign Intelligence Advisory Board. He also served as chairman of a joint study group examining all of the United States' foreign intelligence efforts, a group whose report resulted in the creation of the Defense Intelligence Agency in 1961.

At the request of Dulles, Kirkpatrick also compiled an internal report on the 1961 Bay of Pigs Invasion. The controversial report, which remained classified until 1998, was critical of the planning and execution of the operation and was rumored to have caused resentment among staff at the CIA, particularly Dulles. Kirkpatrick would later write that he believed the report cost him "a fighting chance at the directorship."

In December 1961, John McCone, the new director of the CIA, asked Kirkpatrick to chair a working group to study the organizational structure of the agency, which resulted in a major reorganization. In April 1962, Kirkpatrick was named executive director of the CIA, a new position created in order to help ease the administrative demands on McCone and future directors.

In 1965, Kirkpatrick left the CIA to become a professor of political science at Brown University. In addition to lecturing and teaching, he served as president of the Association of Former Intelligence Officers, and was a member of the board of directors of the Naval War College and the Defense Intelligence College. Kirkpatrick also contributed to Encyclopædia Britannica (as well as other encyclopedias) and wrote three books for the general public, as well as textbooks used in the intelligence community and articles for journals dealing with military and intelligence matters. He retired from Brown in 1982 and moved to Middleburg, Virginia, one year later.

== Death ==
Kirkpatrick died in 1995 at his home in Middleburg, Virginia. He was survived by his wife, Rita Kirkpatrick, two sons and two daughters from his first marriage to Jeanne Courtney, and five grandchildren.

== Works ==
=== Books ===
- The Real CIA: An Insider's View of the Strengths and Weaknesses of Our Government's Most Important Agency. New York: Macmillan (1968). OCLC 1006692.
- The U.S. Intelligence Community: Foreign Policy and Domestic Activities. New York: Hill and Wang (1973). ISBN 0809095017. OCLC 1151673590.

=== Articles ===
- "Cold War Operations: The Politics of Communist Confrontation, Part VII: The Intelligence Organization." Naval War College Review, vol. 20, no. 10 (May 1968), pp. 61–70. U.S. Naval War College Press. JSTOR 44640648.
