= Correspondent =

Journalist contributing reports from a remote location

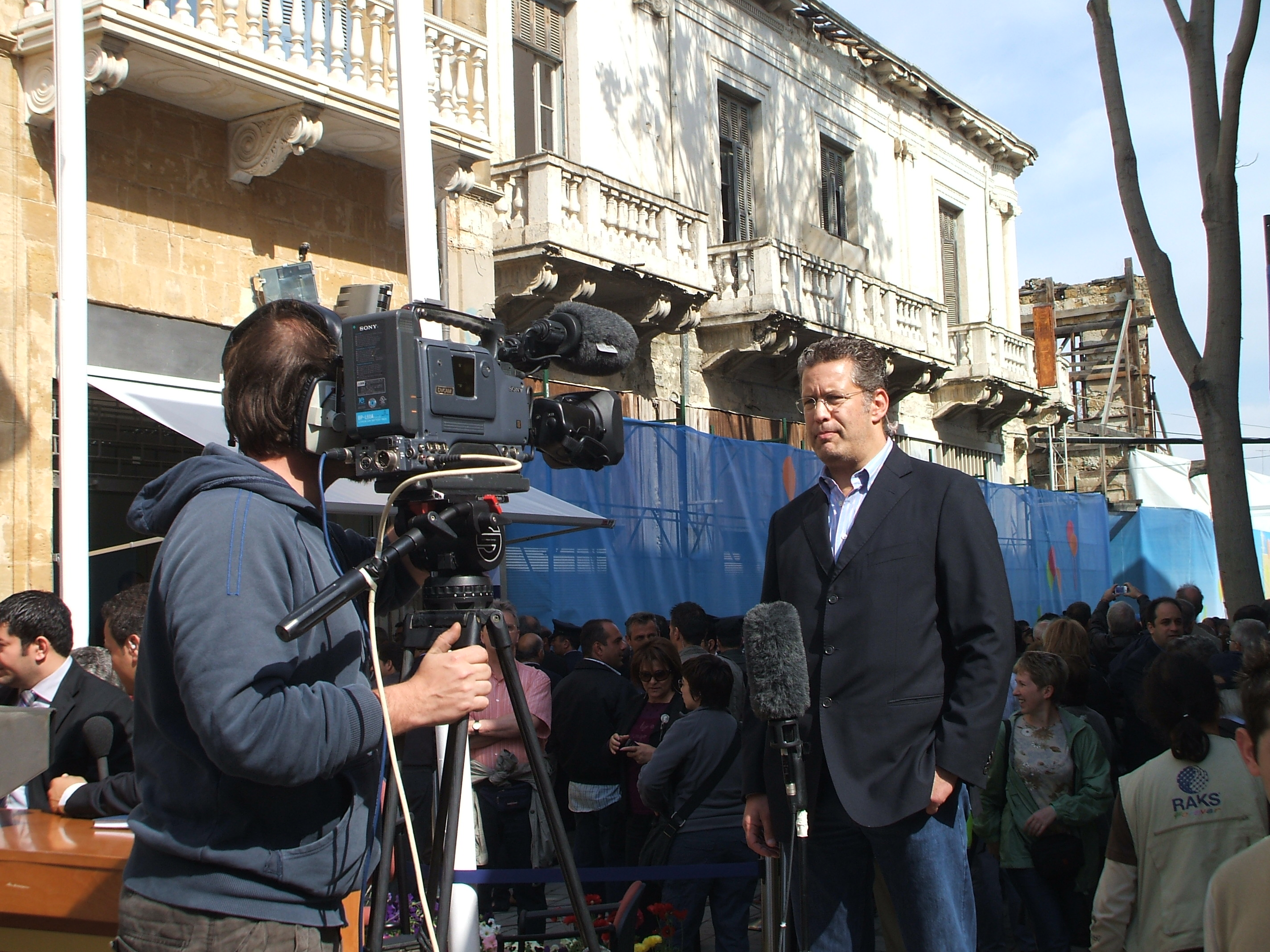
- A correspondent on the scene

Occupation
- Names: Reporter, journalist
- Synonyms: Reporter, journalist, communicator, contributor
- Pronunciation: /ˌkôrəˈspändənt,ˌkärəˈspändənt/
- Occupation type: Profession
- Activity sectors: Mass media, entertainment, newspaper

Description
- Competencies: Communication, responsibility
- Fields of employment: Mass media, newspaper, magazine, broadcasting
- Related jobs: Editor, reporter, writer

A correspondent is a journalist or reporter employed by a media organization to cover and communicate news, commentary, or events from a designated geographic location, such as a foreign bureau, or on a specialized subject like politics, finance, or conflict zones. Correspondents perform functions including researching stories, conducting interviews with sources, verifying facts under deadlines, and delivering firsthand accounts often from remote or hazardous environments, which distinguish their role from general reporters stationed at headquarters. The term "correspondent" refers to the original practice of filing news reports via postal letter. The largest networks of correspondents belong to ARD (Germany) and BBC (UK).

== Vs. reporter ==
In Britain, the term 'correspondent' usually refers to someone with a specific specialist area, such as health correspondent. A 'reporter' is usually someone without such expertise who is allocated stories by the newsdesk on any story in the news. A 'correspondent' can sometimes have direct executive powers, for example a 'Local Correspondent' (voluntary) of the Open Spaces Society (founded 1865) has some delegated powers to speak for the Society on path and commons matters in their area including representing the Society at Public Inquiries.

== Common types of correspondents ==
A capital correspondent is one who reports from headquarters of government.

Cost of living correspondents have been employed by several news agencies in the light of the "cost of living" crisis in the United Kingdom from 2021 onwards.

A legal or justice correspondent reports on issues involving legal or criminal justice topics, and may often report from the vicinity of a courthouse.

A foreign correspondent is anyone who reports from primarily foreign locations. A foreign bureau is a news bureau set up to support a news gathering operation in a foreign country.

A red carpet correspondent is an entertainment reporter who reports from the red carpet of an entertainment or media event, such as a premiere, award ceremony or festival.

A war correspondent is a foreign correspondent who covers stories first-hand from a war zone.

The term "correspondent" has been used to refer to comedians who appear regularly on satirical news programs such as The Daily Show.

== On-the-scene TV news ==
In TV news, a "live on-the-scene" reporter reports from the field during a "live shot". This has become an extremely popular format with the advent of Eyewitness News.

A recent cost-saving measure is for local TV news to dispense with out-of-town reporters and replace them with syndicated correspondents, usually supplied by a centralized news reporting agency. The producers of the show schedule time with the correspondent, who then appears "live" to file a report and chat with the hosts. The reporter will go and do a number of similar reports for other stations. Many viewers may be unaware that the reporter does not work directly for the news show. This is also a popular way to report the weather. For example, AccuWeather does not just supply data, they also supply on-air meteorologists from television studios at their headquarters.

== See also ==
- From Our Own Correspondent
- Letter from America
- John Pory
- List of foreign correspondents in the Spanish Civil War
- Parachute journalism
- People's correspondent
- Press pool
- Reporters Without Borders
- Stringer (journalism)
