= Mary Welsh Hemingway =

American journalist (1908–1986)

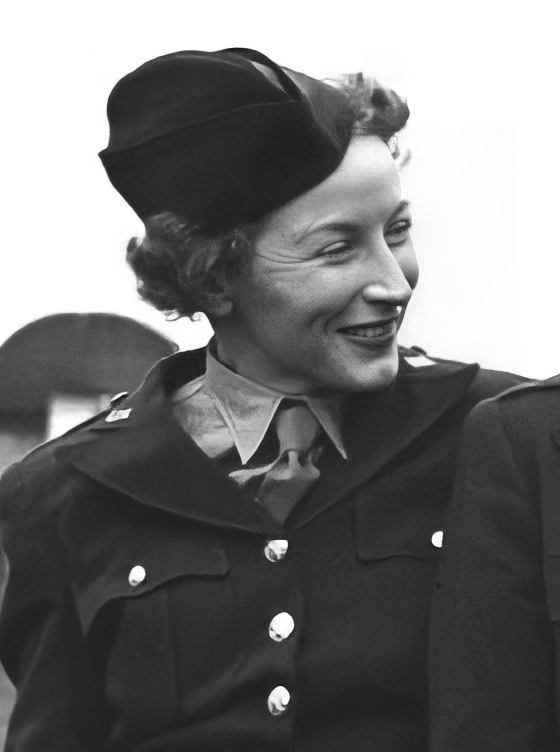
- Welsh wore a uniform when she was a war correspondent.
- Born: Mary Welsh; April 5, 1908; Walker, Minnesota, U.S.
- Died: November 26, 1986 (aged 78); New York City, U.S.
- Burial place: Ketchum, Idaho, U.S.
- Occupations: Journalist, author
- Spouses: Lawrence Miller Cook (m. 1938, divorced); Noel Monks (div. 1945); Ernest Hemingway (m. 1946; died 1961)

Mary Welsh Hemingway (née Welsh; April 5, 1908 – November 26, 1986) was an American journalist and author who was the fourth wife and widow of Ernest Hemingway.

== Early life ==
Born in Walker, Minnesota, Welsh was a daughter of a lumberman. In 1938, she married Lawrence Miller Cook, a drama student from Ohio. Their life together was short and they soon separated. After the separation, Mary moved to Chicago and began working at the Chicago Daily News, where she met Will Lang Jr. The two formed a friendship and worked together on several assignments. A career move presented itself during a vacation in London when Mary started a new job at the London Daily Express. The position soon brought her assignments in Paris during the years preceding World War II.

== As a journalist covering World War II ==
After the fall of France in 1940, Welsh returned to London as a base to cover the events of the war. She also attended and reported on the press conferences of Winston Churchill.

During the war she married her second husband, Australian journalist Noel Monks.

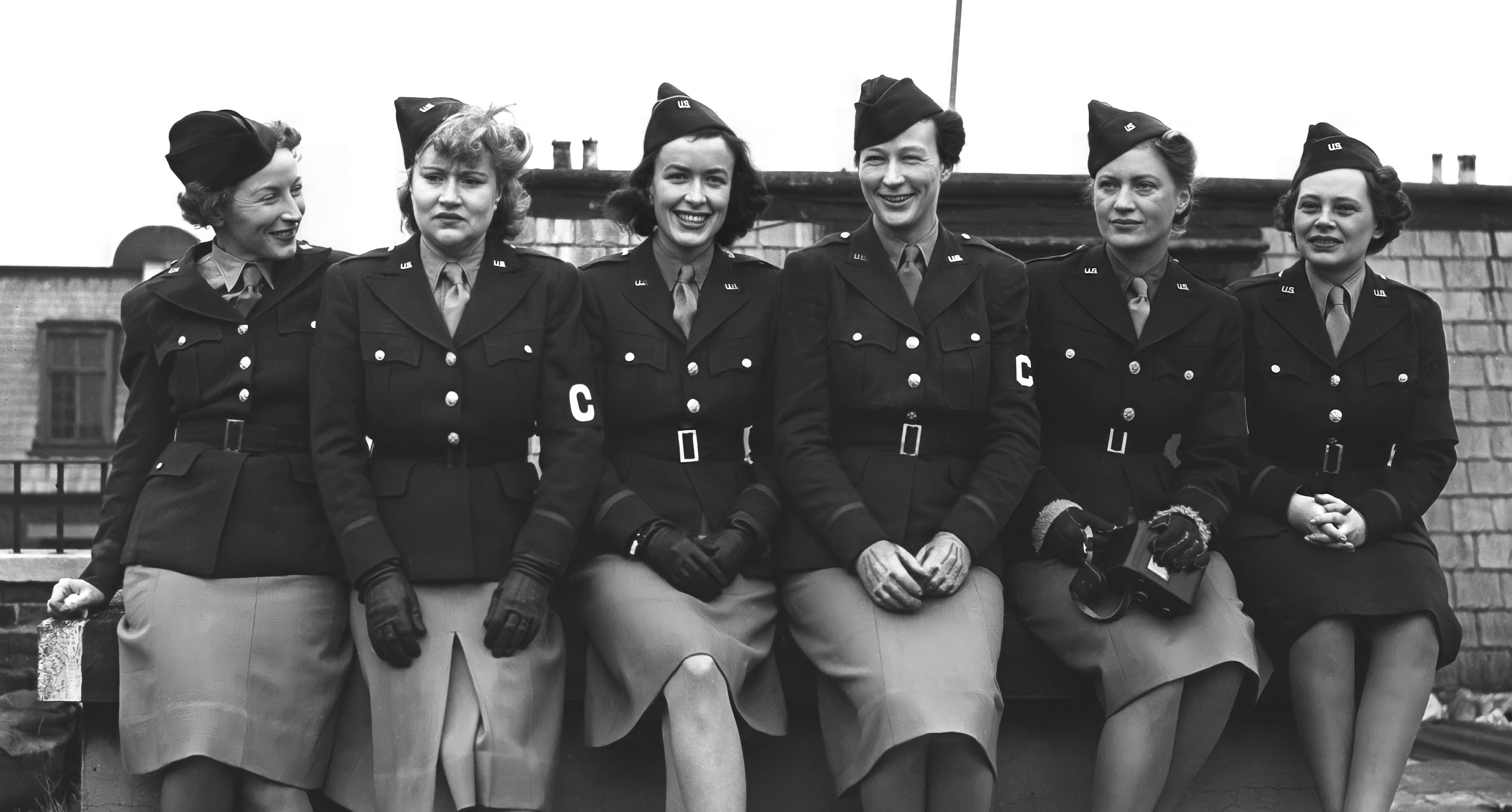
Welsh in 1943 with other female war correspondents who covered the U.S. Army in the European Theater during World War II; from left to right: Mary Welsh, Dixie Tighe, Kathleen Harriman, Helen Kirkpatrick, Lee Miller, and Tania Long

== Marriage to Ernest Hemingway ==
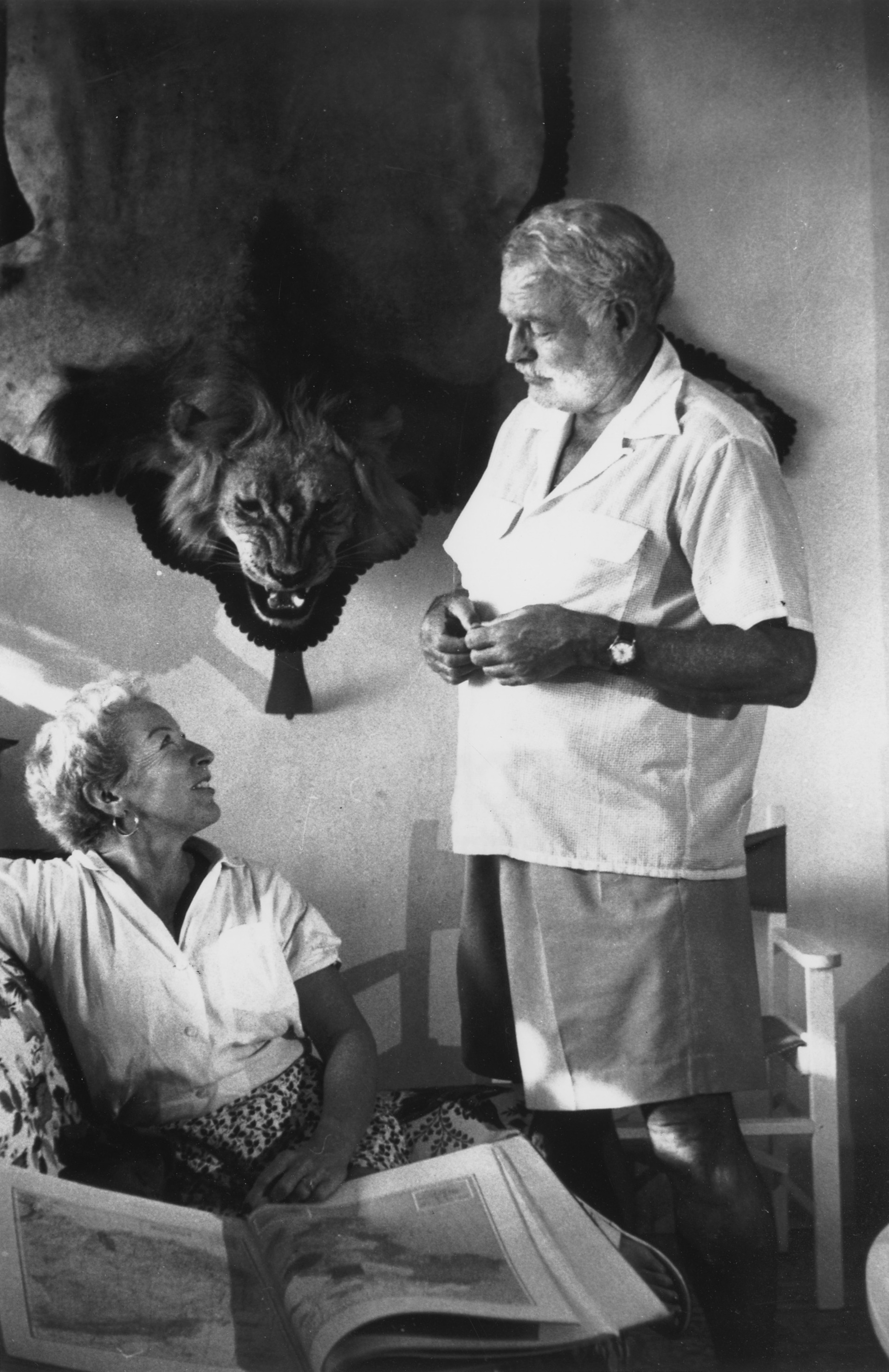
Mary and Ernest Hemingway in Cuba

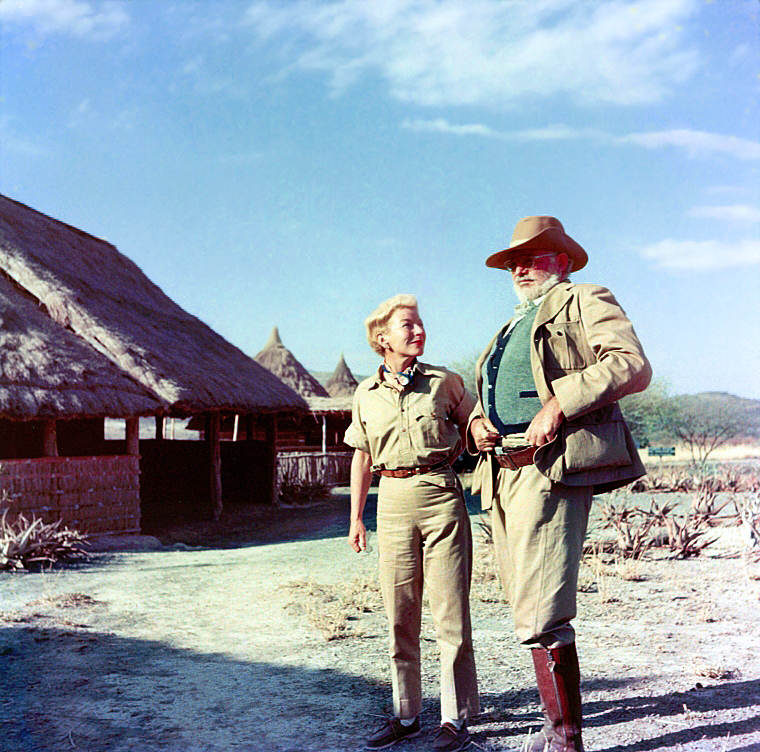
Mary and Ernest Hemingway on safari (1953–1954)

In 1944, Welsh met American author Ernest Hemingway while covering the war in London, and they became intimate. In 1945, she divorced Noel Monks, and in March 1946, she married Hemingway in a ceremony in Cuba.

Welsh's and Hemingway's temperaments were well-suited to one another; while Hemingway's previous wife, war correspondent Martha Gellhorn, had chafed against his efforts to assert his dominance, Mary Welsh wrote, "I wanted him to be the Master, to be stronger and cleverer than I; to remember constantly how big he was and how small I was."

In August 1946, Welsh had a miscarriage due to an ectopic pregnancy.

After their wedding, Mary lived with Hemingway in Cuba for many years and, after 1959, in Ketchum, Idaho. In 1958, while still in Cuba, she appeared in a non-speaking role, along with her husband, in cameo appearances in John Sturges's film version of Hemingway's 1952 novella, The Old Man and the Sea. Hemingway portrayed a gambler in the film, and Mary an American tourist.

It was after they had moved to Ketchum, in the early morning hours of July 2, 1961, that Mary was awakened by a loud noise, and discovered that her husband had "quite deliberately" shot himself with his favorite shotgun. According to biographer James Mellow, Hemingway had unlocked the basement storeroom where his guns were kept, gone upstairs to the front entrance foyer of their Ketchum home, and with the "double-barreled shotgun that he had used so often it might have been a friend", had shot himself. Mary and other family members and friends initially told the press that the death had been "accidental", but in an interview with the press five years later, Mary admitted that Hemingway had committed suicide.

== Later life ==
Following Hemingway's suicide in 1961, Mary acted as his literary executor, and was responsible for the publication of A Moveable Feast, Islands in the Stream, The Garden of Eden, and other posthumous works. She gave the manuscript of A Moveable Feast to Tatiana Kudriavtseva, a translator from the Soviet Union, who was able then to publish a Russian translation simultaneous with the original's publication in English.

In 1976, she wrote her autobiography, How It Was. Further biographical details of Mary Welsh Hemingway can be found in the numerous Hemingway biographies, and in Bernice Kert's The Hemingway Women.

In her later years, Mary moved to New York City, where she lived in an apartment on 65th Street. After a prolonged illness, she died in St. Luke's Hospital at age 78, on November 26, 1986. In her will, she had stipulated that she be buried in Ketchum next to Hemingway, where they are now interred together.
