= Kajsa Rothman =

Swedish author, war volunteer, dancer

Karin Kajsa Rothman
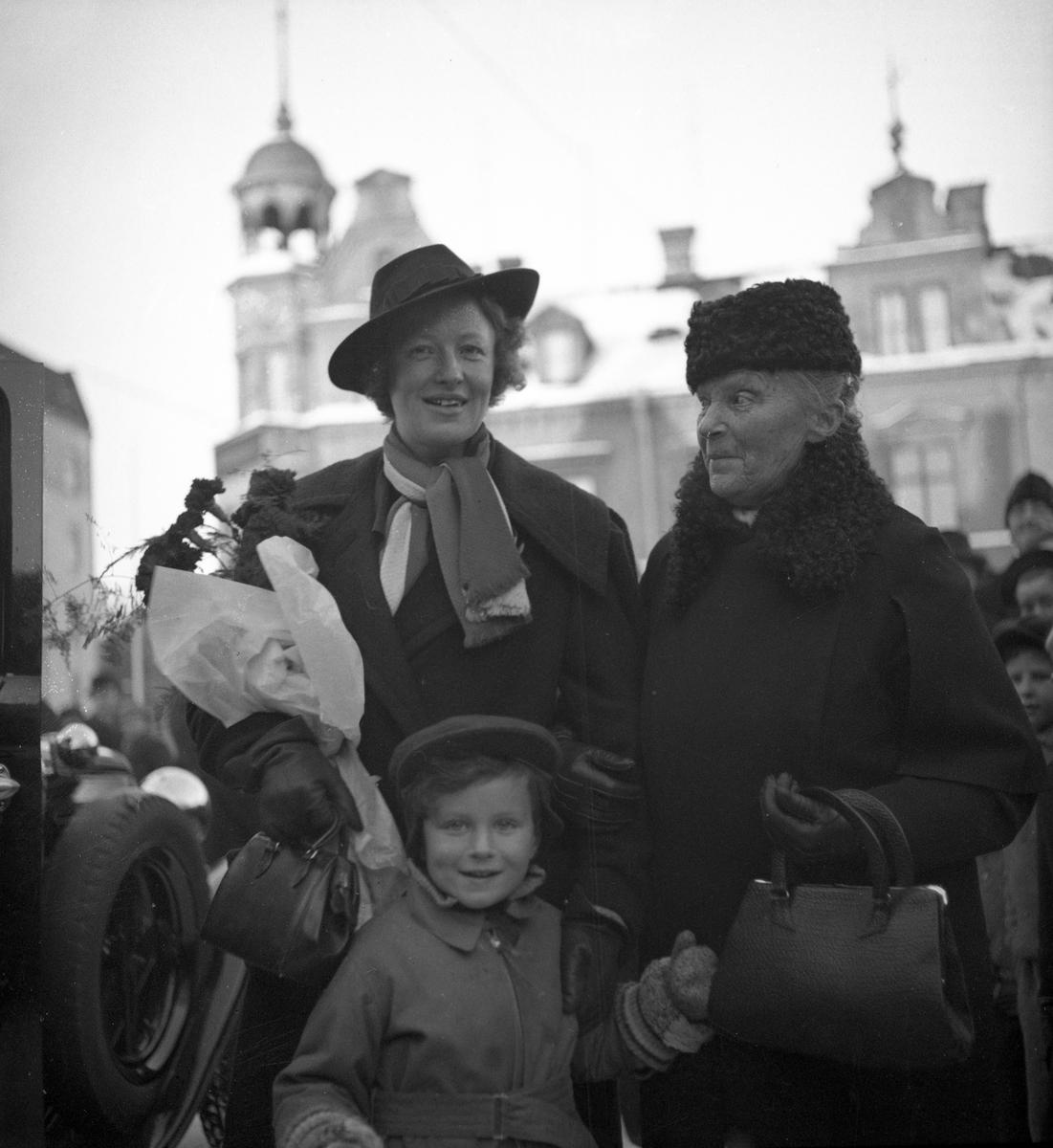
- Kajsa Rothman in the middle, 1 January 1938
- Born: 20 August 1903; Karlstad, Sweden
- Died: 31 October 1969 (aged 66); Tequisquiapan, Mexico
- Occupations: Activist, journalist, dancer
- Known for: Activism during the Spanish Civil War

Karin Kajsa Rothman (1903–1969) was a multilingual activist, journalist and the first Swedish volunteer in the Spanish Civil War. In her youth, she also became widely known as a marathon dancer.

== Life ==
Rothman was born on 20 August 1903 in Karlstad, Sweden, the eldest child of Anna Helin and Helmer Rothman. Because her father served as the editorial secretary on the local newspaper, Karlstads Tidning (now Karlstads-Tidningen, KT), Kajsa Rothman hoped to pursue the same field, but her father objected and wanted her to pursue a career in physiotherapy after graduation from Uppsala. Instead, she moved overseas to seek adventure in Europe.

=== Dancer ===
She participated in numerous dance marathons throughout Europe in her youth. According to Hannson, she spent 3 years as a professional marathon dancer in competitions that required couples to dance round the clock with the winner lasting the longest. "Rothman danced her way through Europe and won all her competitions." As a well-trained and tall dancer, standing 180 centimetres (5.9 ft), she out lasted all of the other competitors. Once, she and her partner won after dancing for 63 days and nights in a row.

Ending her dancing career, she moved to the south of France and Romania, where she found work as a governess before traveling to Barcelona, Spain in 1934 and opening her own travel agency. There, she took advantage of her multilingual skills in: English, French, German, Spanish, Italian, Romanian, Armenian and Arabic in addition to her native Swedish. It was a skill that would serve her later.

=== Activist ===
In July 1936, when the Spanish Civil War broke out, she was the first Swede to volunteer to serve and took a position as a Red Cross nurse. She mainly worked to help the wounded by transporting them to safer places. Recounting one of her experiences in a letter to her mother, she recalled seeing, "a wounded poor Swedish boy. One arm and the other hand were amputated and his head was also badly messed up. He was so glad to speak to someone Swedish." Soon, she arranged the young Swede, Bruno Franzén, to travel home to Sweden as soon as possible. In an article that appeared in her father's paper, Karlstads Tidning titled “Give Bruno new hands,” she published an urgent appeal for readers to contribute to his care.

Transitioning to work with the Swedish organization, Help to Spain, she focused on growing financing for orphanages in France and Spain. She wrote articles for the Help to Spain magazine Solidaritet and became a broadcaster on Swedish radio transmitted from Madrid. As a press attaché to the Spanish government she worked with other foreign correspondents and contributed to Karlstads Tidning describing the brutality of the Spanish war. Upon returning to Sweden, she wrote a book titled Spanska barn ritar om kriget (Spanish children draw the war) in 1937.

Through her activism, she became widely known in Sweden. In 1938, when she visited Karlstad, Sweden, about 5,000 people waited at the railway station. During her time there, she delivered 135 lectures to strengthen Sweden's solidarity with the Spanish people. She also started “Kajsa’s milk fund” to send powdered milk to Spanish children.

When Franco's forces won the civil war in Spain in 1939, Rothman fled with other activists to France and then Mexico, settling in the village of Tequisquiapan north of Mexico City. There she opened a bar with another woman and ran a school for the children of Mexico's indigenous people.

=== Personal life ===
In Mexico, Rothman married so she could get permission to stay in the country, taking the last name Rothman de Rosas. She died there of breast cancer on 31 October 1969 at the age of 66. She is buried in Tequisquiapan.

== Bibliography ==
- Andersson, Karl-Olof, 'Frivilliga svenskar slogs mot Franco', Populär historia, 2017:4 (Hämtad 2020-03-20)
- Karlsson, Mekki & Gustafsson, Kerstin, 'Solidaritet: Kaysa Rothman de Rosas', Vi mänskor, 1986:2/3, s. 30-35
- Rothman, Kajsa, Spanska barn ritar om kriget, Solidaritet, Stockholm, 1937
- Viedma, Lucy, 'Spanska inbördeskriget 1936-1939', Världen i källaren, Arbetarrörelsens arkiv och bibliotek, Stockholm, 2002 (Hämtad 2020-03-20)
