= Kathleen Harriman Mortimer =

American journalist (1917–2011)

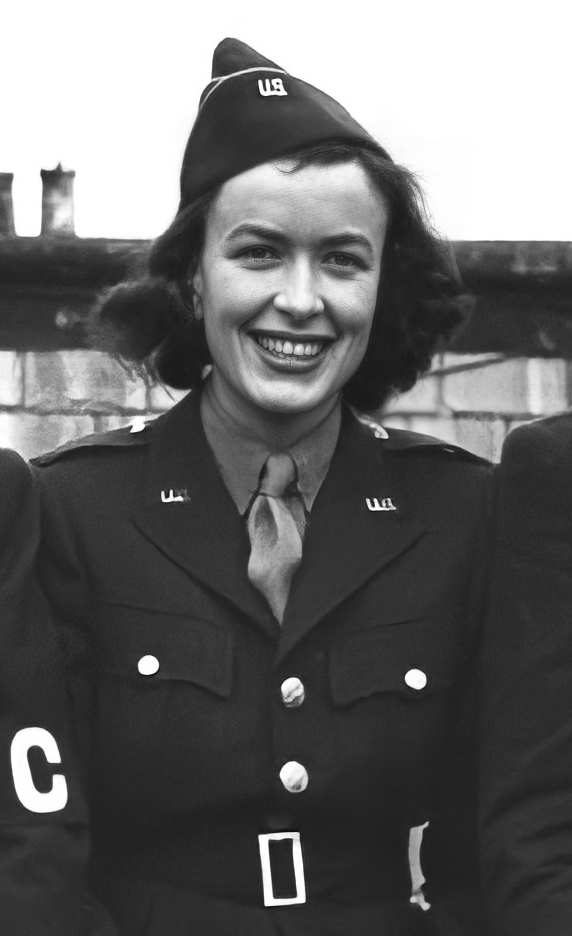
- Harriman wearing a uniform when she was a war correspondent
- Born: December 7, 1917; New York City, U.S.
- Died: 17 February 2011 (aged 93); New York City, U.S.
- Occupation: Journalist
- Spouse: Stanley G. Mortimer Jr. (m. 1947; died 1999)
- Children: 3

Kathleen Harriman Mortimer (December 7, 1917 – February 17, 2011) was an American journalist and socialite who played an important role in helping her father and President Franklin Delano Roosevelt with behind-the-scenes management of the American delegation to the Yalta Conference. Her father W. Averell Harriman was then the US Ambassador to the Soviet Union, and he played an important role in assisting Roosevelt, since the conference was held in Yalta, a Black Sea port part of the Soviet Union.

In 1941, her father was US ambassador to the United Kingdom, and he pulled strings to arrange for her a visa and a job as a reporter for Hearst's International News Service. She managed to be a successful war correspondent despite a lack of experience. She would later work for Newsweek magazine.

In 1943, her father was made ambassador to the Soviet Union, and she went with him as an aide. Mortimer found herself working with Roosevelt's daughter Anna, and Sarah, daughter of Prime Minister Winston Churchill, who played similar roles, serving as hostess and babysitter to their temperamental fathers. In her account of the behind-the-scenes roles the three women played at the Yalta Conference, Catherine Grace Katz wrote that her father delegated to Mortimer the task of breaking off a distracting affair her father Harriman was having with Pamela Churchill, then Winston Churchill's young daughter-in-law. Mortimer learned the Russian language during the three years she lived with her father there, and her wartime correspondence contains detailed descriptions of key Soviet leaders, and their wives. Historian Geoffrey Roberts wrote that, after first lady Eleanor Roosevelt, she was the second most well-known American woman in the Soviet Union.

She married Stanley G. Mortimer Jr. in 1947. They had three children.

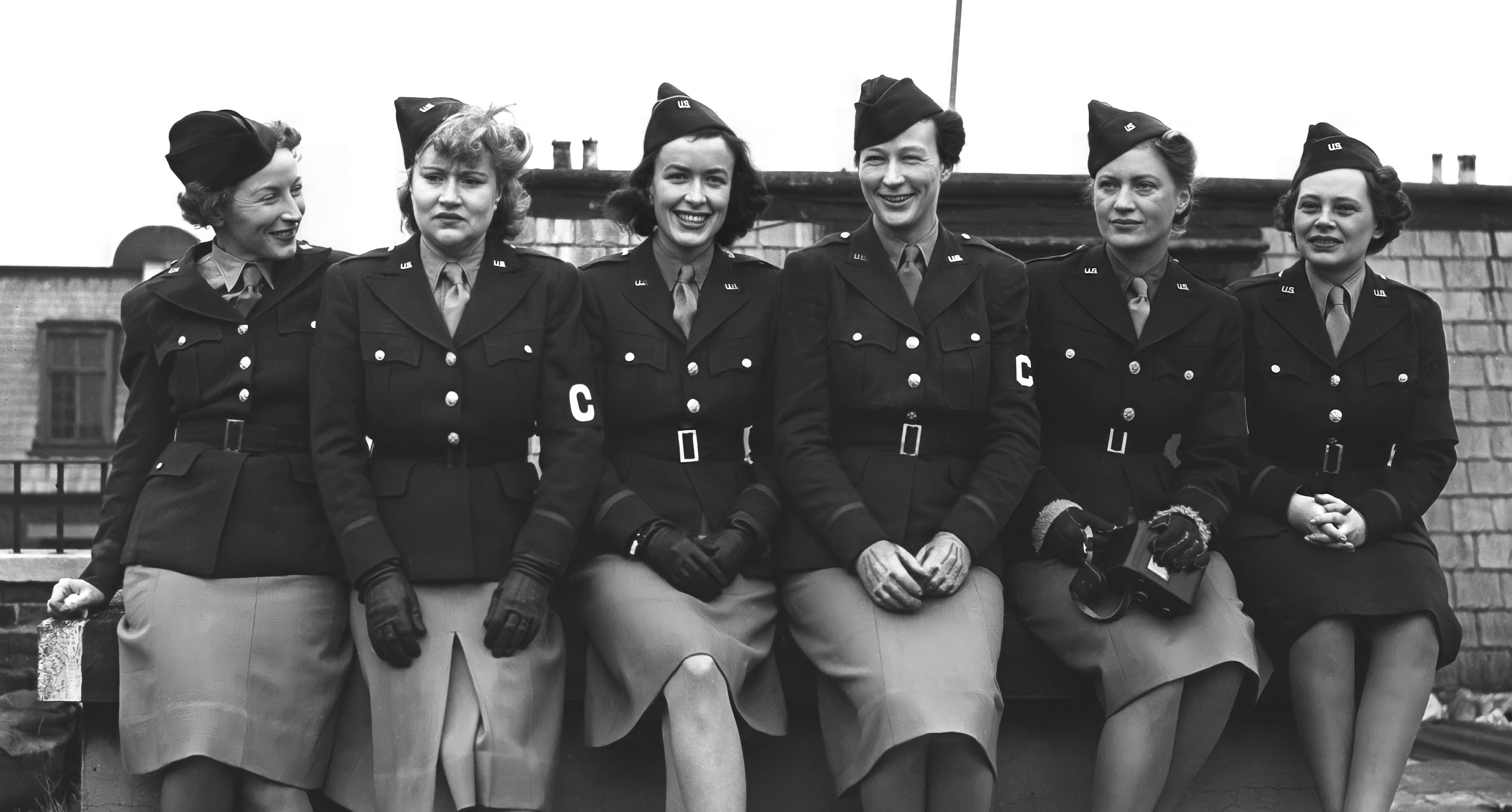
Harriman in 1943 with other female war correspondents who covered the U.S. Army in the European Theater during World War II; from left to right: Mary Welsh, Dixie Tighe, Kathleen Harriman, Helen Kirkpatrick, Lee Miller, and Tania Long

== Russia and after ==
In January 1944, her father sent her to observe the opening of a mass-grave of 11,000 Polish soldiers. Their deaths were seen as a war crime. Both Germany and the Soviet Union invaded Poland under the terms of Molotov–Ribbentrop Pact, and, in 1954, Mortimer was called as a witness to try to determine which nation had performed the mass summary execution. Mortimer's conclusion was that the Germans were responsible for the killing, and that the limited evidence that Soviets had been responsible was a German ploy. That was later proven incorrect, and it has been widely established that the crime was carried out by the Soviets.

Pamela Churchill married Mortimer's father in 1971. In his will, her father left Pamela half his estate, left just $4,000 to each of his daughters, and put the remainder in a trust to benefit his daughters, their children and grandchildren. Pamela was one of the trustees overseeing the trust. Mortimer and her sister became concerned that the trustees had been investing the funds in the trust recklessly. Over just a few years bad investment choices had eroded the fund's capital from $30 million to $3 million. Mortimer and her sister went to court to have Pamela's assets frozen.

== See also ==
- The Daughters of Yalta (2020) book
