= Dixie Tighe =

American war correspondent

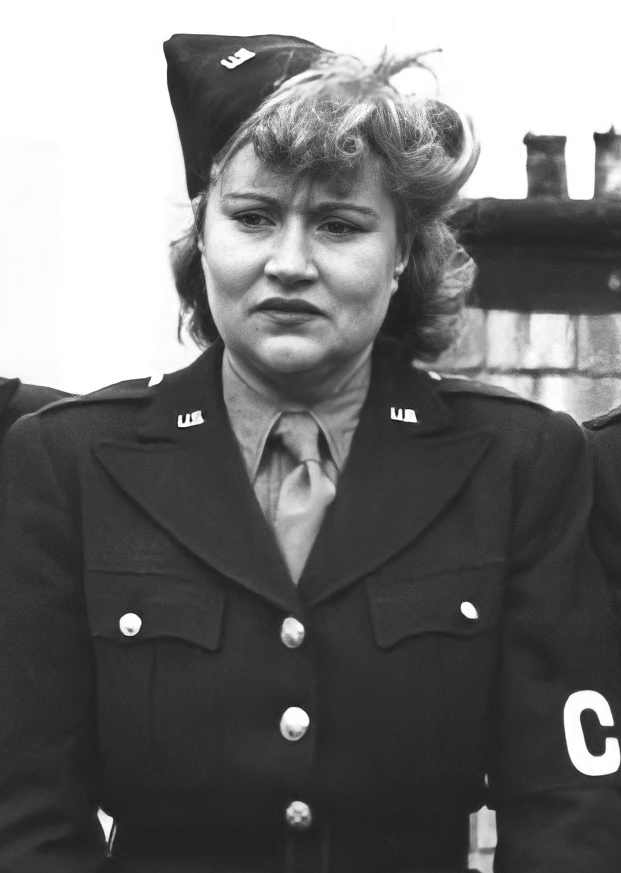
- Dixie Tighe in 1943 - official war correspondents were issued uniforms so they would qualify for POW status, if captured.
- Born: May 23, 1905; Charleston, South Carolina, U.S.
- Died: December 31, 1946 (aged 41); Tokyo, Japan
- Occupations: Reporter, war correspondent

Dixie Tighe (May 23, 1905 - December 31, 1946) was an American war correspondent.

== Biography ==
Tighe's father had been a reporter, and she followed in his footsteps in 1925.

Prior to World War II, her assignments included covering the trial of Bruno Hauptman, the kidnapper of the Lindbergh baby, and "stunt reporting", including reporting on her scuba-diving and skydiving lessons.

Tighe worked for INS and New York Post during World War II.

Nancy Caldwell Sorel, author of a book on female war correspondents, described her as "famous for her blunt language and flamboyant lifestyle".

Female war correspondents were rare, and she was the first female correspondent to ride on a bomber during a bombing mission. Tighe and another female correspondent were denied permission to accompany paratroopers on D-Day, being told the jolt of a parachute could "damage their 'delicate female apparatus', causing vaginal bleeding".

Secretary of War Robert P. Patterson honored war correspondents during an event in Washington, D.C., on November 23, 1946. Tighe was one of the correspondents he honored.

Tighe was struck by a severe headache at an event for correspondents in Tokyo on December 27, 1946. She was taken to the hospital for examination, where she suffered a stroke, and died five days later, on December 31, 1946.

President Harry Truman honored five living female journalists at an event on April 20, 1947, and gave a posthumous award honoring Tighe to her mother.

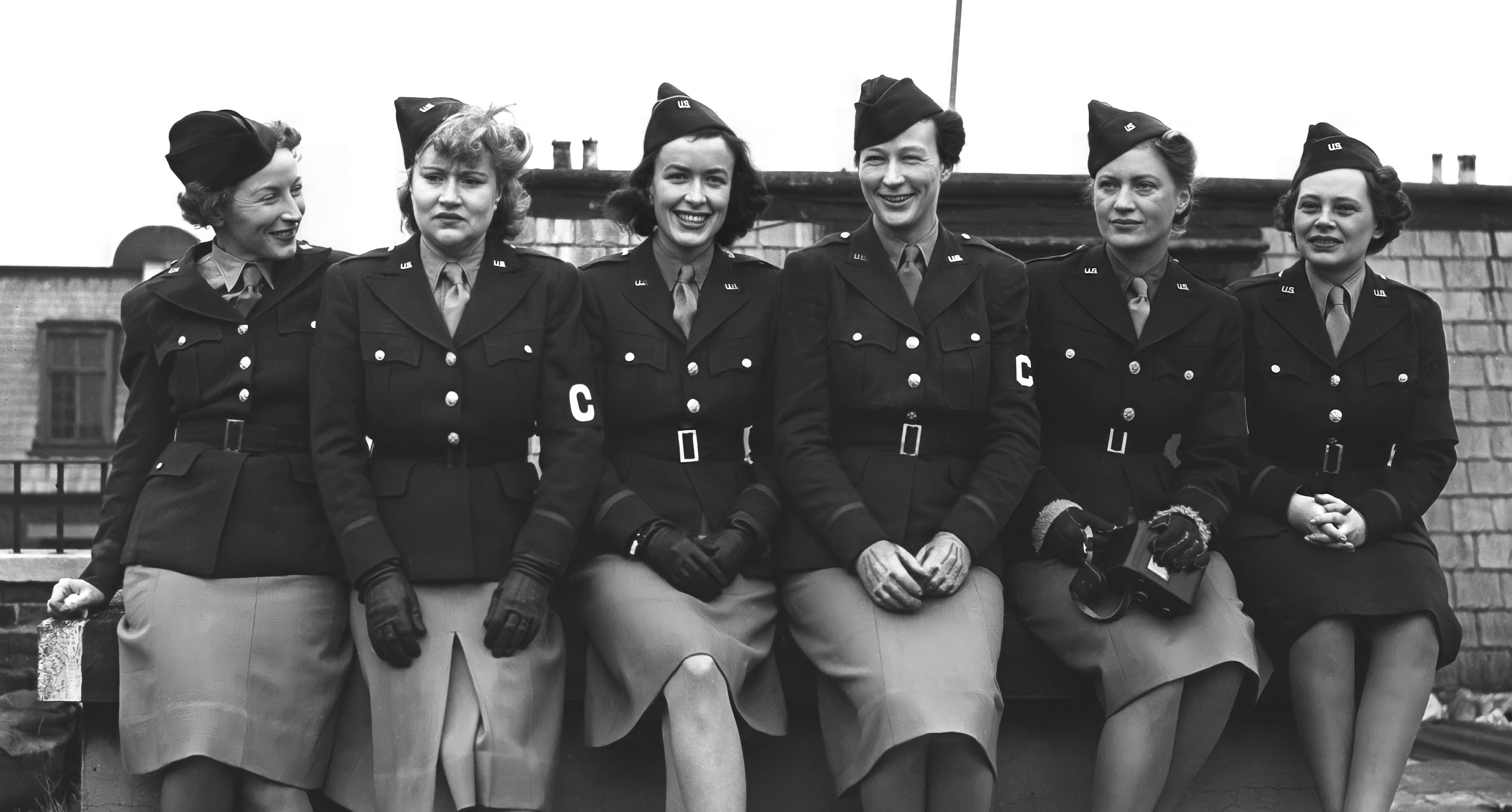
Tighe in 1943 with other female war correspondents who covered the U.S. Army in the European Theater during World War II; from left to right: Mary Welsh, Dixie Tighe, Kathleen Harriman, Helen Kirkpatrick, Lee Miller, and Tania Long
