= Tania Long =

American journalist and war correspondent

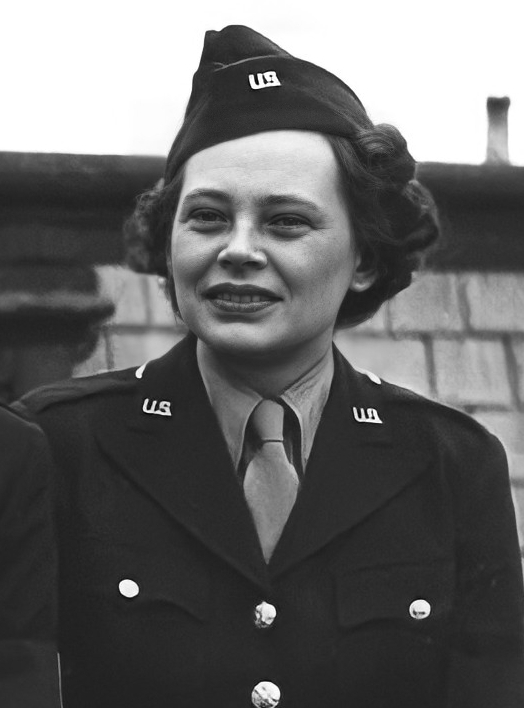
- In uniform as a war correspondent in 1943
- Born: April 29, 1913; Berlin, Germany
- Died: September 4, 1998 (aged 85); Ottawa, Ontario, Canada
- Education: Sorbonne; Institut d'Etudes Politiques de Paris
- Occupations: Journalist, war correspondent
- Spouses: Merwin Mallory Gray (m. 1932, divorced) Raymond Daniell (m. 1941; died 1969)
- Children: 1
- Father: Robert Edward Crozier Long

Tania Long (April 29, 1913 – September 4, 1998) was an American journalist and war correspondent during World War II.

== Early life ==
Born on April 29, 1913, Tania Long was the only child of Irish journalist Robert Edward Crozier Long and his Russian wife, Tatiana Mouravieff. After several years of living in Scandinavian capitals and attending the Lorenz Lyceum in Berlin from 1920 to 1924, Tania studied at the Ecole des Jeunes Filles at Saint-Germain-en-Laye, near Paris, until 1927. From then until 1930, she was a student at the Malvern Girls' College in England. In her post-graduate work at the Sorbonne in Paris (1930–1931) and at the Paris Ecole des Sciences Politiques, she specialized in history and economics. She received her journalistic training by observing and assisting her father.

== Career ==
=== Early career ===
While studying in Paris, Long met and fell in love with an American Merwin Mallory Gray, and after their marriage in Paris in 1932, they moved to New York City, where their son, Robert Merwin Gray, was born the following year. Around 1935, Long became an American citizen. She began working as a reporter for the Newark Ledger the following year.

Long decided to stay in Berlin, Germany, and worked for the New York Herald Tribune. She noticed that people were disappearing from her apartment building. After about ten days, she left for Denmark. Tania spent two weeks in Copenhagen taking down by hand the news copy from the Polish front sent by Joseph Barnes, Herald Tribune correspondent. She was subsequently dispatched to Paris, where she received notification of her permanent assignment.

=== During World War II ===
However, in late September 1939, Long was transferred to London, where a shortage of staff had developed due to the illness of the bureau chief, Ralph Barnes. It was supposed to be a temporary position but became permanent. In late 1939, Long, by then divorced, met her future husband, Raymond Daniell, London correspondent for The New York Times. Before meeting Tania, Ray had considered newspaper work in London "a man's job", but he wrote later that "she provided us with as much competition as any man in London." In September 1940, Long covered the bombing of London, among other things.

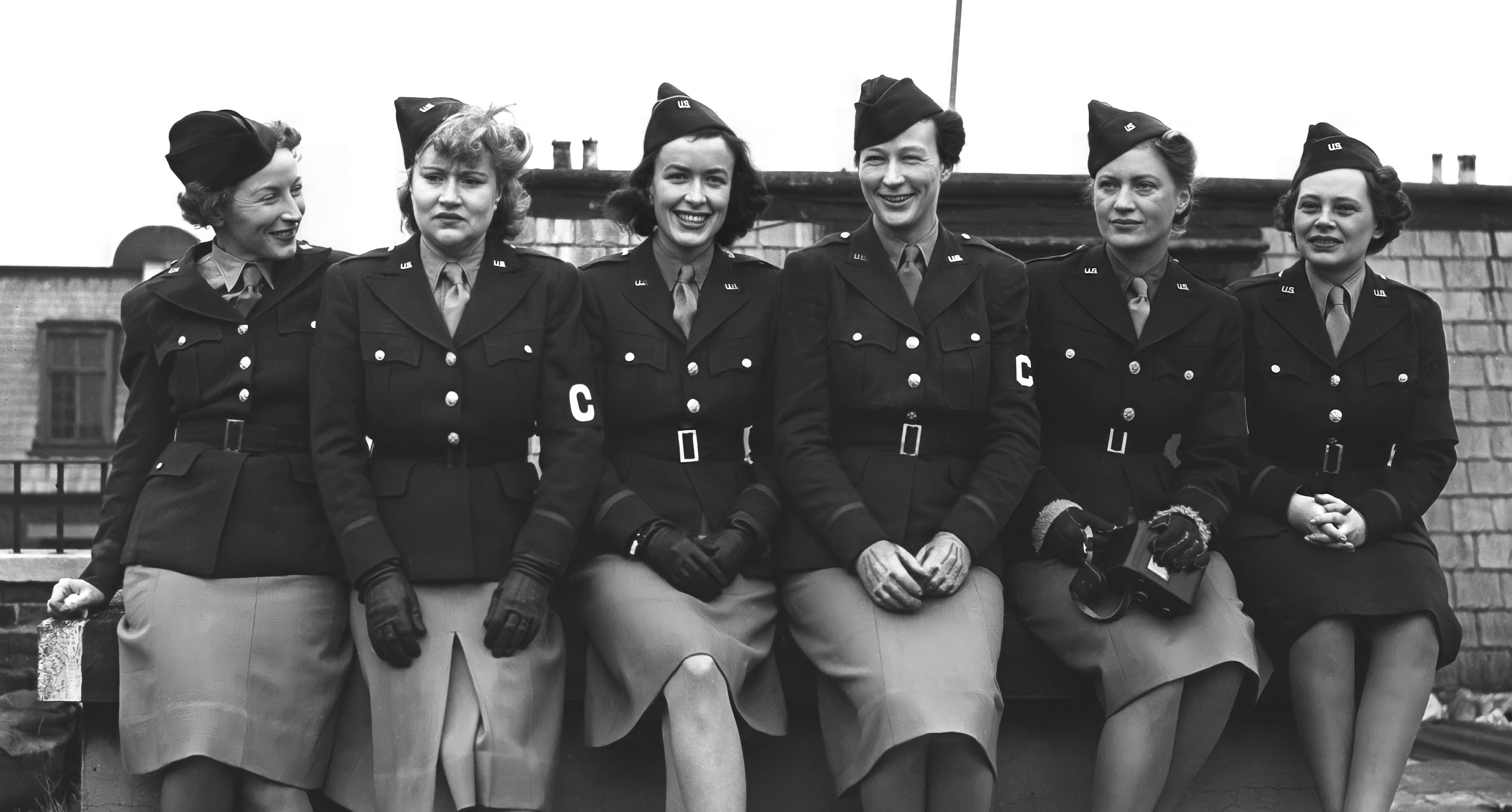
Long in 1943 with other female war correspondents who covered the U.S. Army in the European Theater during World War II; from left to right: Mary Welsh, Dixie Tighe, Kathleen Harriman, Helen Kirkpatrick, Lee Miller, and Tania Long

By early 1940, it became evident that Hitler would invade the Low Countries and France, and Long got her family out of France to Ireland. At that time, all American civilians were ordered out of the European war zone by the United States government, which then sent three ships to Ireland to pick them up, taking Long's son and mother to the United States.

In February 1941, an article appeared in the New York Herald Tribune: "The 19th annual Front Page Ball of the New York Newspaper Women's Club was held last night [at] the Waldorf-Astoria Hotel. Mrs. Franklin D. Roosevelt, the wife of the President, was the special guest of honor. The highlight of the evening was the presentation of two awards [...] by Mrs. Roosevelt for outstanding work by New York City newspaper women during 1940. The prize winners in the contest sponsored by the club were Miss Tania Long, war correspondent of the New York Herald-Tribune, and Miss Kay Thomas [...] of The New York Sun."

==== Assigned job during World War II ====
On November 22, 1941, Tatiana Long and Raymond Daniell married in London. Tania left the Herald Tribune and joined The New York Times in February 1942. Remaining based in London for the duration of World War II, Ray and Tania returned twice to their home in Westport, Connecticut, where they had two months of vacation. Here, Long was reunited with her son and mother. In 1944, Long was asked to do a job for the Office of Strategic Services (forerunner of the CIA) and was assigned to the headquarters of the First Army in Spa, Belgium, which was already occupied by US forces. As war correspondents for The New York Times, Tania and Ray followed the Allied forces into Berlin in 1945. Ray arrived there the day the Allies entered Berlin, and Long followed the day after.

During World Wars I and II, Long and her parents' possessions, including the Long family papers and photos, had been stored in a downtown Berlin warehouse. Though the warehouse had been bombed, everything they owned was intact. With the termination of the war, Tania remained in Germany and assisted her husband in The New York Times coverage of the Nuremberg Trials. There, Long began to write about living conditions in post-war Germany, describing the "dangerous effect of fraternization by American troops in Germany on the American occupation policy."

Secretary of War Robert P. Patterson honored war correspondents, including Long, at an event in Washington on November 23, 1946.

=== Post-war Britain ===
In 1946, The New York Times went front page on December 16: "Raymond Daniell reported from London that 'only politics, which has blighted so many royal romances, is delaying the announcement of the engagement of Princess Elizabeth, heiress to the British throne, and Prince Philip of Greece." Long attended the wedding of Princess Elizabeth and Philip Mountbatten on November 20, 1947, and on June 2, 1953, Long and Daniell carried out their final assignment as London correspondents of The New York Times, with Daniell writing the main story of the coronation of Queen Elizabeth II while Tania covered the coronation ceremony in Westminster Abbey. That same year, Daniell and Long were transferred to The Times's Canadian bureau in Ottawa.

== Later life ==
When Ray was assigned to the United Nations in 1964, the Daniells moved to New York City, thus enabling Long to pay frequent visits to her mother in Westport, Connecticut. In 1967, Long and Daniell returned to Ottawa, Ontario, Canada. "Ottawa became his home by chance. Assigned here by the mighty New York Times in the early 1950s, he stayed on for 12 years before accepting an appointment to the paper's United Nations staff." Ray and Tania were in retirement together for two years until Ray died on April 12, 1969, at the age of 67.

In late 1969, Long began her second career (which lasted for ten years) as the publicist for the Music Department of the National Arts Centre in Ottawa.

Long's mother had come to Canada via Berlin, Brittany, and Connecticut and, just a few days short of her 94th birthday, fell ill with pneumonia and died on March 29, 1978. In 1981, Long's son, Robert Gray, died at the age of 46. Although he had been married, he had no children.

Long died on September 4, 1998.

== Personal life ==
A long-time resident of Ottawa, Ontario, Canada, Long was an activist who believed in participatory democracy. Long enjoyed attending opera, ballet, and symphony concerts; her hobbies included reading, swimming, and gardening.
