= The Daughters of Yalta =

2020 non-fiction book by Catherine Katz

The Daughters of Yalta: The Churchills, Roosevelts and Harrimans: A Story of Love and War
- First edition (US)
- Author: Catherine Grace Katz
- Language: English
- Subject: World War II
- Genre: Non-fiction
- Publisher: Houghton Mifflin Harcourt (US); HarperCollins (UK)
- Publication date: September 29, 2020
- Publication place: United States
- Media type: Print
- Pages: 416
- ISBN: 978-0-358-11782-7 (Hardcover)
- Dewey Decimal: 940.53141

The Daughters of Yalta: The Churchills, Roosevelts and Harrimans: A Story of Love and War is a 2020 book by American historian Catherine Grace Katz, published on September 29, 2020, by Houghton Mifflin Harcourt.

The book tells the story of Sarah Churchill (daughter of Winston Churchill), Anna Roosevelt (daughter of Franklin Delano Roosevelt), and Kathleen Harriman (daughter of W. Averell Harriman) — all of whom accompanied their fathers to the Yalta Conference, where they had roles that were unofficial but nonetheless important.

== Reception ==
Publishers Weekly lauded the book as "a fresh take on a decisive moment in the history of WWII and the Cold War," and ranked it as one of the best nonfiction books of 2020.

Jennet Conant, reviewing the book for The New York Times, said it was "entertaining" and "packed with vivid personalities (and) insider observations about a pivotal moment in history."

Moira Hodgson, writing for The Wall Street Journal, commended the book as "skillfully written and meticulously researched."
