= Robert Edward Crozier Long =

Anglo-Irish journalist and author

Robert Edward Crozier Long (29 October 1872 in Cashel, County Tipperary, Ireland—18 October 1938, Berlin), was a noted Anglo-Irish journalist and author.

== Biography ==
=== Early life ===
He was born at Ardmayle House, near Longfield and Fort Edward, located just north of Cashel. Known in his younger days as Edward, he was the second son of Robert Hare Long of Ardmayle, and Anna Geraldine McAuliffe. When he was only two years old, his family moved from Ardmayle to Mayfield House, east of Cashel. Another move followed in late 1877 when the family left Tipperary and moved on to Dublin, to the southern suburb of Kingstown (now Dún Laoghaire). Since his father was often away on business or attending horse-racing events, young Edward barely knew him, and was just seven years old when he died in Montreal in February, 1880.

On 19 October 1881, a Church of Ireland Merit Certificate was awarded to Edward Long of Mariners Church, Kingstown. He presumably also attended a local elementary school. However, in 1885, aged around 13, Edward emulated his elder brother John and ran away from home. He made his way to the waterfront and took the boat to Liverpool, England where he found a job working on the docks, but before long made his way down to London. About this time, he also made the decision to be known by his first name of Robert rather than Edward.

=== Early career ===
Settled in London by 1888, Long, through a stroke of luck, was introduced to Jerome K. Jerome (1859–1927), journalist and author of Three Men in a Boat (1889) fame, who promptly hired him as an office boy. Jerome was then the co-editor of The Idler and sole editor of To-Day, two of the most popular British periodicals of the time. Robert soon began writing book reviews and other short items which he then submitted to Jerome. For several years, Robert continued to develop and polish his writing skills, and accordingly rose through the ranks, so that by 1897, he found himself on the editorial staff both publications. He became confident enough, while continuing to work for Jerome, to set out on his own and in 1894 became "engaged in journalism as London correspondent for American newspapers."

From 1897 to 1904, he served as secretary to the famous English journalist, William Thomas Stead (1849–1912), who founded the Review of Reviews in 1890, and who went down with the Titanic in 1912. "He was one of W. T. Stead's staff on the Review of Reviews in 1898, in which capacity he went to Russia to interview Count Leo Tolstoy (1828-1910)". As a result, Robert Long became well-acquainted with the charismatic Russian novelist and philosopher (and author of War and Peace (1866)). "Tolstoy, who had great personal sympathy with Stead, deplored the Review of Reviews..." "It lacked the single intellectual and moral trend which Tolstoy wanted in everything." "I have this from my friend, Mr. Robert Crozier Long, who knew Tolstoy well."

Robert Long started work for the Westminster Gazette early in his career, circa 1898, when he first went to Russia, and stayed with them until the paper folded. In 1899, he returned to Russia to report on the famine there as a special correspondent for the Daily Chronicle. By this time, Robert Long's considerable linguistic talents began to emerge. Already conversant in French, he began to study Russian. During 1904 and 1905, he returned to "Russia as special correspondent of [the] New York American."

=== Russia ===
According to Tania Long Daniell, her parents met in Russia in around 1905. She does not recall where, or under what circumstances. However, they fell in love and were married in Russia sometime in 1909. Thus, Robert Edward Crozier Long married Tatiana, daughter of Arsene Mouravieff, President of the Tamboff District Court, by his wife, Vera Kreiter, of a Russian family with a Baltic name. Arsene Mouravieff was a relative of Count Nicholas Mouraviev-Amoursky (1809–1881), aide-de-camp to the Czar and Governor-General of Eastern Siberia. The Mouravieffs, whose name is derived from the Russian word for "ant", are a family of the Russian nobility, dating from the period when Russia was invaded and occupied by the Tartars. Tatiana and Robert spent the first two years of their marriage residing in Russia. When Robert Long was assigned to Berlin by the Westminster Gazette in 1911, he and his wife left Russia and settled in the German capital. Two years later, on 29 April 1913, their daughter Tatiana (known as Tania), was born there.

=== Balkan Wars ===
During the Balkan War of 1912, fought between Bulgaria and Turkey, Robert Long was there as a War correspondent, and as was advisable, he bought himself a Bulgarian army uniform from a second-hand store, hired a servant, rented a horse, and went off to war. He was so preoccupied with his thoughts formulating his next article, that before he realized it, he had wandered into the middle of the battlefield, and ended up being captured by the Turks. When they took off his uniform, they discovered that it had belonged to a Bulgarian general who had died. But the Turks didn’t know this and believed they had captured a real prize, a true Bulgarian general, so they threw Long in jail where he stayed for an entire week before he was able to convince the Turkish authorities to contact the British Consul in Istanbul. Meanwhile, his wife Tatiana was worrying herself to death back home in Berlin.

=== World War I ===
The stewing Balkan cauldron erupted again during late June, 1914, with the assassination of the Archduke Franz Ferdinand of Austria, at Sarajevo, Bosnia. This event triggered the First World War, with Germany and Austria poised to attack their European neighbours. "My father sent my mother and me out of Berlin in July 1914, as war looked imminent and he stayed behind. He had to leave his apartment, after storing all their possessions, in order not to be arrested as an enemy alien after war was declared, and took refuge in the British Embassy which made him a (temporary) second secretary, giving him diplomatic status. He remained in Berlin until a special train left taking all the foreign diplomats out of Berlin about ten days after the declaration of war. Mother, my German nanny and myself stayed with my English godfather and family until father joined us." The Longs did not of course return until the war was over in November 1918.

=== Russian Revolution ===
If he wasn't escaping one world hot spot, he was rushing toward another, this time to Russia at the outbreak of the Revolution of 1917. Sent there as a correspondent for the Associated Press of America, Long arrived in Russia early in 1917. Before long, he had befriended Prince Lvoff, Prime Minister of Russia during the very brief liberal regime in early 1917. A passage from Long's book, Russian Revolution Aspects, advises: "Had the Revolution settled down quietly under Lvoff's practical and extremely democratic rule, Russia would be spared the humiliation and anguish of today. For Lvoff was not only a great and tried democrat; he was also a great patriot. Though himself an aristocrat and a man of wealth, he was ready to go to great lengths to meet the Socialist spirit of the workmen, soldiers and peasants."

Long also had something to say about Russia's ill-fated royal family: "Three times in the course of my many visits to Russia, I saw Czar Nicholas II, the last, least considerable and unluckiest of the Romanoffs. The first time, he was at the height of his power; the second time, he had just unwillingly surrendered a part of that power; and the third time, he was returning to his palace between armed guards, a captive of the Revolution."

By this time Long had earned an international reputation as an outstanding journalist, so it is not surprising that he ultimately came to the attention of the American press baron, William Randolph Hearst (1863–1951), who was so taken with Long's articles on the Russian Revolution, that he made him a very attractive job offer. Long returned to the States with his wife and daughter toward the end of 1917, but soon quit since Hearst wanted to censor his articles.

=== Berlin ===
With his family he returned to Berlin in late 1918, having spent the previous year residing in Stockholm, Sweden, where he could be close to the latest political developments in Russia. For several years, his journalistic career continued to prosper, and important newspapers engaged his services as a special correspondent in Russia, Scandinavia and the United States. He began his association with The New York Times in 1923, as their Berlin-based financial correspondent, and wrote weekly columns for them right up until the time of his death. He also wrote for The Saturday Evening Post and for newspapers in Birmingham and Leeds, England. Long resumed working for The Economist (of London) in 1926 (having previously been employed by them briefly in the early 1920s), and continued writing for the London weekly until his death.

Not only did Long possess a keen understanding of economics in addition to his journalistic and linguistic skills, he also possessed an inquiring logical mind. His daughter Tania relates: "Father was fascinated with the Einstein Theory of relativity and understood it very well, having become a friend of Einstein's principal assistant in Germany. He was a frequent visitor to Professor Freundlich at the Einstein Potsdam Observatory (where he took me) and wrote many articles on the subject."

A long-time resident of Berlin, Robert Long witnessed first-hand the rise of Hitler and Nazi Germany. In 1937, when Hitler placed restrictions on transferring money and bank accounts out of Germany, and therefore invoked mail censorship as a means of preventing such transfers, Long managed to outwit the Fuehrer by mailing out instructions to his English bank by writing on a postcard! By September 1938, Robert recognized how dangerous Hitler and the Nazis had become, so: "He went (to England) after the Munich Crisis, when many thought war would break out any second and met me (Tania) in England. He had sent mother to Bruges in Belgium while he remained to cover the dramatic events for a couple of British papers (as well as his own) whose correspondents had left Berlin. He was overworked and developed bronchitis and was ill when he arrived in London, having left the German capital at what seemed the last moment. He did not see Churchill but saw men close to Churchill, (men) who promised to pass on his message: if France and England acted immediately to show Germany they meant war if it continued on its way, war would be averted. But this would be the last chance. Another year, it would be too late, as Germany would then be strong enough to take on the allies, in fact the world."

=== Death ===
When Robert returned to Berlin just a week later, he found himself to be the last British citizen still in Berlin, aside from the British diplomats. Although he had always enjoyed good health, his bronchitis, aggravated by the stormy political climate, turned into pneumonia, which resulted in his death on 18 October 1938. The next day, The Times published his obituary, extracts of which read:

"Mr. R. E. C. Long, correspondent in Berlin of The Economist and financial correspondent of the New York Times, died suddenly in Berlin yesterday, telegraphs our Berlin correspondent. He was suffering from influenza last month, when with other English correspondents, he had to leave Berlin temporarily, and complications developed on his return. Robert Edward Crozier Long was a foreign correspondent of long experience, well-versed in German history and literature, and with a profound knowledge of the background to developments of the past five years, on which, particularly on the economic side, he wrote with distinction. At the time of his death, he had been longer in Berlin than any other English (or British or Irish) correspondent. He had written several books, mainly on German, Russian and Scandinavian life and politics. He was one of the first English translators of Tchekov."

The 19 October 1938 edition of The New York Times devoted a lengthy column to him. The following are excerpts from his New York Times obituary:

ROBERT E. C. LONG, JOURNALIST, DEAD
Financial Correspondent for New York Times in Berlin
Wrote Several Books
REPORTER IN BALKAN WARS
Covered Revolt in Russia in 1906
Had Contributed to Economist of London

Wireless to The New York Times

Berlin, 18 October 1938

Robert Edward Crozier Long, financial correspondent of The New York Times and a contributor to The Economist of London, died here early this morning of pneumonia after a nervous breakdown. Actually, he may be accounted victim of the recent international crisis. He was 65 years old. In a career of more than forty years in journalism Mr. Long experienced a series of international crises. He was in Russia during the revolution of 1906-07, with the Turkish Armies during the two Balkan wars and in Germany as correspondent of The Westminster Gazette at the outbreak of the World War. He left Berlin on the ambassadorial train in August, 1914, abandoning most of his possessions and returning only after the war.

This last crisis came when his only daughter was on the ocean on her way from the United States to join him. Advised to leave Germany with other journalists of British nationality, he sent his wife away but remained himself until what seemed the last moment, when he went to Belgium just before the Munich conference was arranged. After spending a few days in Brussels and London he returned a week ago to resume his old life here. But the experience had shaken him, and when he took cold, his power of resistance was insufficient to ward off pneumonia.

Mr. Long is survived by his widow, a daughter of the late Arsene Mouravieff, president of the Tamboff district court in Russia under the Czar's regime, and a daughter, Mrs. Tatiana Gray, who until recently was engaged in newspaper work in New Jersey. She is now here. A brilliant and lovable personality with native Irish wit, great linguistic talent and much travel made Mr. Long an attractive companion in any environment. In his leisure hours he was a great outdoor man, sailing, swimming, playing tennis and indulging in other sports whenever the opportunity offered. He was a general favorite in Berlin journalistic and banking circles. In the latter he was a trusted confidant of many prominent men. By his colleagues he was regarded as an epitome of all that was sound and upright in journalism. Funeral services will be held in the chapel at Mattaeikirchof in Schoenberg Thursday.

Mr. Long, who had written occasionally on financial topics from Berlin for The New York Evening Post before the war, became the regular financial correspondent of The New York Times in 1923. Since then he had sent a weekly cable on the German market and on the financial situation in that country, which was published on Mondays, and occasional dispatches on intervening days.

Born at Cashel, Tipperary, Ireland, on Oct. 29, 1872, son of the late Robert Hare Long of Ardmayle House and Mayfield, Cashel, he was educated at Dublin and was engaged in journalism as the London correspondent for American newspapers from 1894 to 1896. During the two following years he served on the editorial staff of Today, Idler and The Review of Reviews.

After he had been sent to Russia to interview Tolstoy, he became a special correspondent for The Daily Chronicle in 1899, covering the famine in East Russia. He also served in that country as special correspondent for The New York American in 1904-5. He came here for the Portsmouth Peace Conference of 1905, and returned to Russia the following year."

After his funeral service at Berlin's Mattaeikirche Chapel, Robert Edward Crozier Long was buried in the adjacent cemetery. When threatening war clouds gathered ominously over Europe in August 1939, the family left for France, England, and finally the United States.

His widow Tatiana Mouravieva Long died on 29 March 1978, just a week short of her ninety-fourth birthday, and her ashes were scattered over her daughter's Ottawa rose garden. She was survived by her daughter Tania, her grandson Robert, her sister Vera and her niece Tatiana.

== Personal life ==
Robert Long did not attend university and instead educated himself. He learnt to speak fluent German, Russian and accented French. In addition he spoke passable Swedish and Danish and read Finnish. He was an active man who thoroughly enjoyed skating, swimming and sailing, and he owned his own boat. Fond of horses, he would often go out riding before breakfast in Berlin's Tiergarten Park. Being somewhat absent-minded, Robert would become so absorbed in his thoughts - planning his next article - that he would become completely oblivious to where he was or to where he was going. Upon one occasion, he found himself on horseback at Potsdamer Platz, Berlin's equivalent of Piccadilly Circus or Times Square! Upon another occasion he had gone out walking. His wife and daughter, who were out shopping, were both highly amused when they ran into Robert who bowed and politely tipped his hat to them.

Robert had a dry, wry, almost sarcastic sense of humour. When, as a girl, Tania would play, for example, some new fox-trot record, he would say: "that's the tune the old cow died of!" Robert and Tatiana often attended concerts, the theatre and the opera, and they enjoyed dinner parties with their friends.

== Works ==
During his forty years as a journalist, Long managed to find the time to read and translate books by Russian authors and to write several books and countless articles of his own:

- The Reflections of a Russian Statesman (translated from the Russian), 1898
- The War of the Future, 1899
- The Black Monk 1903, (by Anton Chekhov)
- The Kiss, 1908 (by Anton Chekhov)
- Colours of War, 1915 (as Edward Edgeworth)
- The Human German, 1915
- Russian Revolution Aspects, 1919
- The Swedish Woman (a novel), 1924
- The Mythology of Reparations, 1928
- and many articles in Fortnightly Review and other monthlies, chiefly on Russian, German and Scandinavian politics and literature."

Long was one of the first to translate Chekhov into English. According to the author's note in his translation of The Kiss and Other Stories, published in 1908, he states that his 1903 translations of The Black Monk and Other Stories "published five years ago (were) the only collection of Tchekhoff's stories that had up to that time appeared in English." Robert's second cousin, the late Irish essayist, Hubert Butler (1900–1991), also spoke Russian and translated Chekhov's The Cherry Orchard into English.

== Sources ==
- Based on an article by his cousin, Count Caragata, in 1998.
