= Tatiana Kudriavtseva =

Russian editor and translator

- Born: Tatiana Alexseevna Kudriavtseva; March 5, 1920; Leningrad, USSR
- Died: September 29, 2013 (aged 93); Moscow, Russia
- Occupations: Translator and editor
- Spouse(s): Yuri Semyonov (divorced; 1 child); Nikolai Taube (1950–1984)

Tatiana Kudriavtseva (Russian: Татьяна Кудрявцева; 5 March 1920, in Leningrad – 29 September 2013, in Moscow) was a Russian editor and translator of American, English and French literature.

== Early life ==
Tatiana Alexseevna Kudriavtseva was born in Leningrad, in a middle-class family that was prosperous before the Russian Revolution. In the 1920s, her father, a merchant, was sent to a labour camp, and her mother had to work at an amusement centre to support her and her sister. She suffered from tuberculosis and didn't attend school until age 10.

She studied at Leningrad State University for two years before joining a language school, where she learned Japanese and English.

During the Second World War, Kudriavtseva worked in a military language institute. In 1941, she moved with the institute to Ferghana, where she continued her studies in Japanese. In 1943, graduating the institute as a senior lieutenant, she was assigned to the General Secretariat of the People's Commissariat of Foreign Affairs, where she worked with Vyacheslav Molotov, Andrey Vyshinsky, Vasily Sokolovsky and other historical figures. She was involved in the translation of important historical documents, including charters for unconditional surrender, and official minutes of meetings with the senior members of the Allies, among others Winston Churchill, W. Averell Harriman, George F. Kennan.

From her first marriage, to Yuri Semyonov, she had a daughter, Nina. He suffered from a political purge, and they later divorced. She married Nikolai Taube in 1950.

== Career ==
In the 1950s, Kudriavtseva worked in the foreign literature department of a Moscow-based publisher. In 1962, she joined Foreign Literature, an elite and widely circulated monthly journal that serialised American fiction. During her twenty years at the magazine, she wielded considerable influence over what Russians could read of foreign writers.

Kudriavtseva translated for the Soviet Foreign Ministry, and the USSR's delegations to the UNESCO. After her retirement from Foreign Literature, she took up translation as her next career. She went on to translate both literary and pulp fiction, over eighty volumes.

In view of Soviet taboos, she had to be circumspect in her choice of publications. While William Styron's Sophie's Choice was acceptable because of its anti-fascist themes, his The Confessions of Nat Turner was banned because it implied that all rebellions were fated to fail. Likewise, sexual content was taboo in the USSR, and John Updike's Rabbit series, which she translated, had to be sanitised. Her longest battle against the censor was an eighteen-year struggle to publish Margaret Mitchell's Gone with the Wind, which was finally allowed to come out in 1982.

As a literary editor, Kudriavtseva had the rare privilege of frequent travel in Europe and the US, collecting publication rights and even manuscripts. During one of her visits in the US, she met Mary Welsh Hemingway, from whom she obtained the manuscript of Ernest Hemingway's A Moveable Feast. She was able to publish a Russian edition simultaneous with its release in the US.

== Later life ==
Kudriavtseva's second husband died in 1984. She died of a heart ailment in Moscow on 29 September 2013.

== Awards ==
In 2002, Kudriavtseva was awarded the Association of American Publishers Prize for her contributions to literary translation.

== Selected works ==
=== Translations ===
- Elizabeth Gaskell. Mary Barton. Azbuka. ISBN 978-5-389-05511-7.
- Iris Murdoch. A Word Child. Domino. ISBN 978-5-699-25796-6.
- Jack London. Valley of the Moon & Hearts of Three. Pravda. ISBN 5-253-00108-5.
- Doris Lessing. Martha Quest. Eksmo. ISBN 978-5-699-28400-9.
- Joyce Carol Oates. Do With Me What You Will. North-West. ISBN 5-8352-0279-2.
- John le Carré. Smiley's People. Eksmo. ISBN 5-699-10116-0.
- Arthur Hailey. Wheels. Globus. ISBN 5-87790-038-2.
- Mario Puzo. The Sicilian. Political Literature. ISBN 5-250-01278-7.
- John Updike. Rabbit Redux. Zakharov. ISBN 5-8159-0086-9.
- Margaret Mitchell. Gone With The Wind. Lenizdat. ISBN 5-289-00448-3.
- Graham Greene. A Human Factor. Amphora. ISBN 978-5-367-00937-8.

=== Others ===
- Превратности одной судьбы. (Записки литератора и переводчика). R. Valent. 2008. ISBN 978-5-93439-248-3.
