= 1949 Bombay KLM Lockheed L-749 crash =

1949 aviation accident in India

- Video footage of the disaster

Controlled flight into terrain
- Date: 12 July 1949
- Summary: Pilot error
- Site: Near Bombay (now Mumbai), India

Aircraft
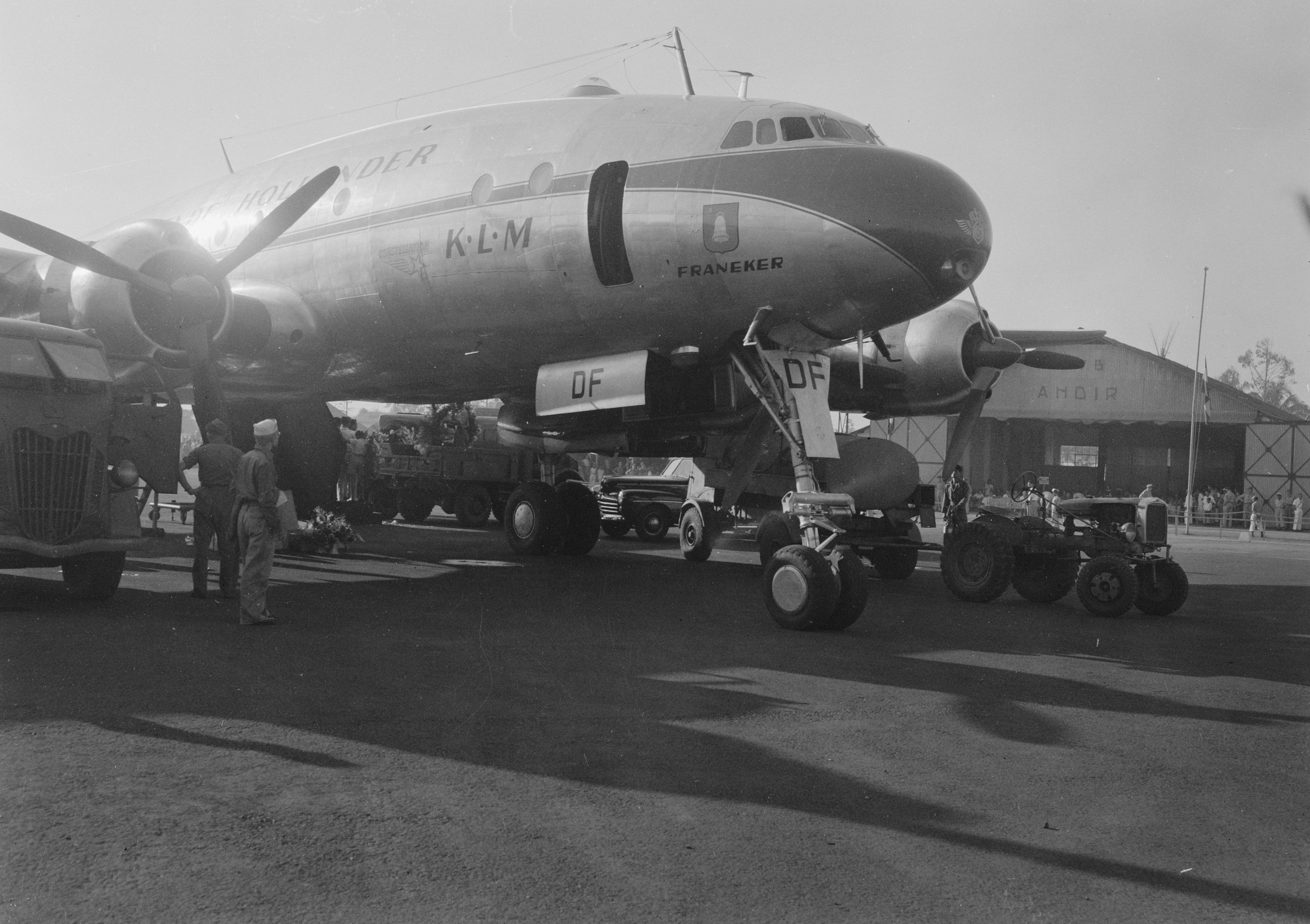
- PH-TDF, the aircraft involved in the accident, seen in 1948
- Aircraft type: Lockheed L-749 Constellation
- Operator: KLM
- Registration: PH-TDF
- Flight origin: Batavia (now Jakarta)
- Stopover: New Delhi, India
- Destination: Amsterdam Airport Schiphol, Netherlands
- Occupants: 45
- Passengers: 35
- Crew: 10
- Fatalities: 45
- Survivors: 0

The Bombay Province KLM Lockheed L-749 crash occurred on 12 July 1949 when a KLM Lockheed L-749 Constellation (registration PH-TDF, named Franeker) crashed into a hill near Bombay (now Mumbai), India, during approach in severe weather. All 45 people on board were killed.

The flight was chartered by the Dutch government and carried a group of 13 prominent American journalists, including radio-commentator Hubert Renfro Knickerbocker, who had been touring the Dutch East Indies as part of a public relations effort during the Indonesian National Revolution. The aim of the journey was to influence American opinion regarding Dutch colonial policy in the region.

== Background ==
In the late 1940s, the Netherlands faced increasing international criticism over its attempts to reassert control over the Dutch East Indies following World War II. Military campaigns known as the police actions had weakened Dutch diplomatic standing, particularly in the United States.

In response, the Dutch government organized a press tour for prominent American journalists, allowing them to travel extensively through the archipelago and interview key figures, including Sukarno, leader of the Indonesian nationalist movement. The tour was intended to present the Dutch perspective and counter negative international coverage.

The journalists traveled approximately 6,000 kilometres over several weeks and were granted unusual access to political and military leaders. By the end of the trip, many participants were perceived as more sympathetic to the Dutch position.

== Aircraft and crew ==
=== Aircraft ===
The aircraft involved was a Lockheed L-749 Constellation, a four-engine long-range airliner operated by KLM. The aircraft, registered PH-TDF and named Franeker, had entered service in 1947 and had accumulated several thousand flight hours prior to the accident. The aircraft had previously operated long-distance flights between the Netherlands and Southeast Asia by other routes due to airspace restrictions.

=== Crew ===
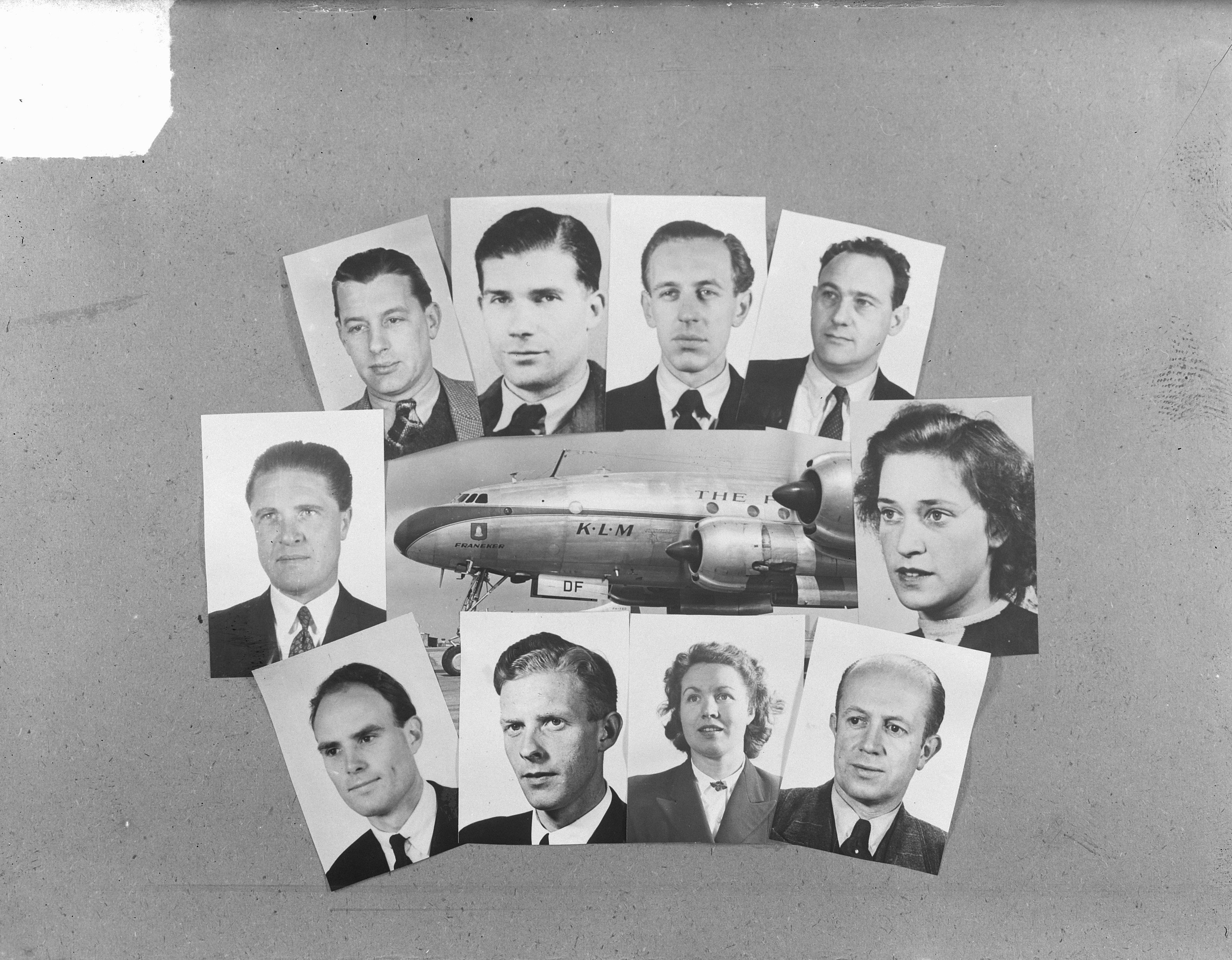
The 10 crew members around the involved aircraft

The flight was operated by a crew of ten, including three pilots, radio operators, flight engineers, and cabin crew.

The captain was Arnoldus Marcelis "Chris" van der Vaart, an experienced pilot who had accumulated over 4,000 flight hours, including more than 1,300 hours on the Lockheed Constellation. He had previously completed numerous long-haul flights between the Netherlands and the Dutch East Indies. The first officer was Cornelis L. van Kooy, assisted by third pilot Pieter Zeeman. The flight crew also included radio operators Johannes Hoogland and Pieter den Daas, as well as flight engineers Heinrich Fronczek and Jacob Willem Dalman. The cabin crew consisted of steward Jacobus Verhaagen and stewardesses Janny Bruce and Carola Graf.

== Flight ==
On 10 July 1949, the aircraft departed Batavia on its return journey to the Netherlands, with scheduled stops including New Delhi and Bombay. The passengers included 13 American journalists and other civilians, along with a crew of ten.

On the morning of 12 July, the aircraft departed New Delhi for Bombay. Weather conditions near Bombay were poor, with heavy monsoon rain and low visibility. During the approach to Santa Cruz Airport, the crew descended to low altitude while attempting to align with the runway.

Shortly after losing visual reference in cloud, the aircraft drifted off course and struck a hill near Ghatkopar, a few kilometres from the airport. The aircraft broke apart on impact and all occupants were killed instantly.

== Victims ==
There were 45 people on board the aircraft; 10 crew members and 35 passengers. Among the passengers were 13 prominent American journalists representing major newspapers and radio networks across the United States, including Hubert Renfro Knickerbocker. The journalists had participated in a Dutch government-sponsored press tour of the Dutch East Indies, and their presence on board contributed to the international impact of the disaster.

List of journalists who were killed:

- Hubert Renfro Knickerbocker (radio-commentator)
- William Newton (Scripps Howard)
- Charles Gratke (Christian Science Monitor)
- Bertram Hulen (The New York Times)
- Vincent Mahoney (San Francisco Chronicle)
- James Branyan (Houston Post)
- N.A. Barrows (Chicago Daily News)
- John Werkley (Time magazine)
- Elsie Dick (Mutual Broadcasting System)
- E. Burton Heath (Newspaper Enterprise Association)
- Thomas Falco (Business Week)
- George Moorad (The Oregonian)
- Fred Colvig (Denver Post)

== Aftermath ==
=== Burial and memorials ===
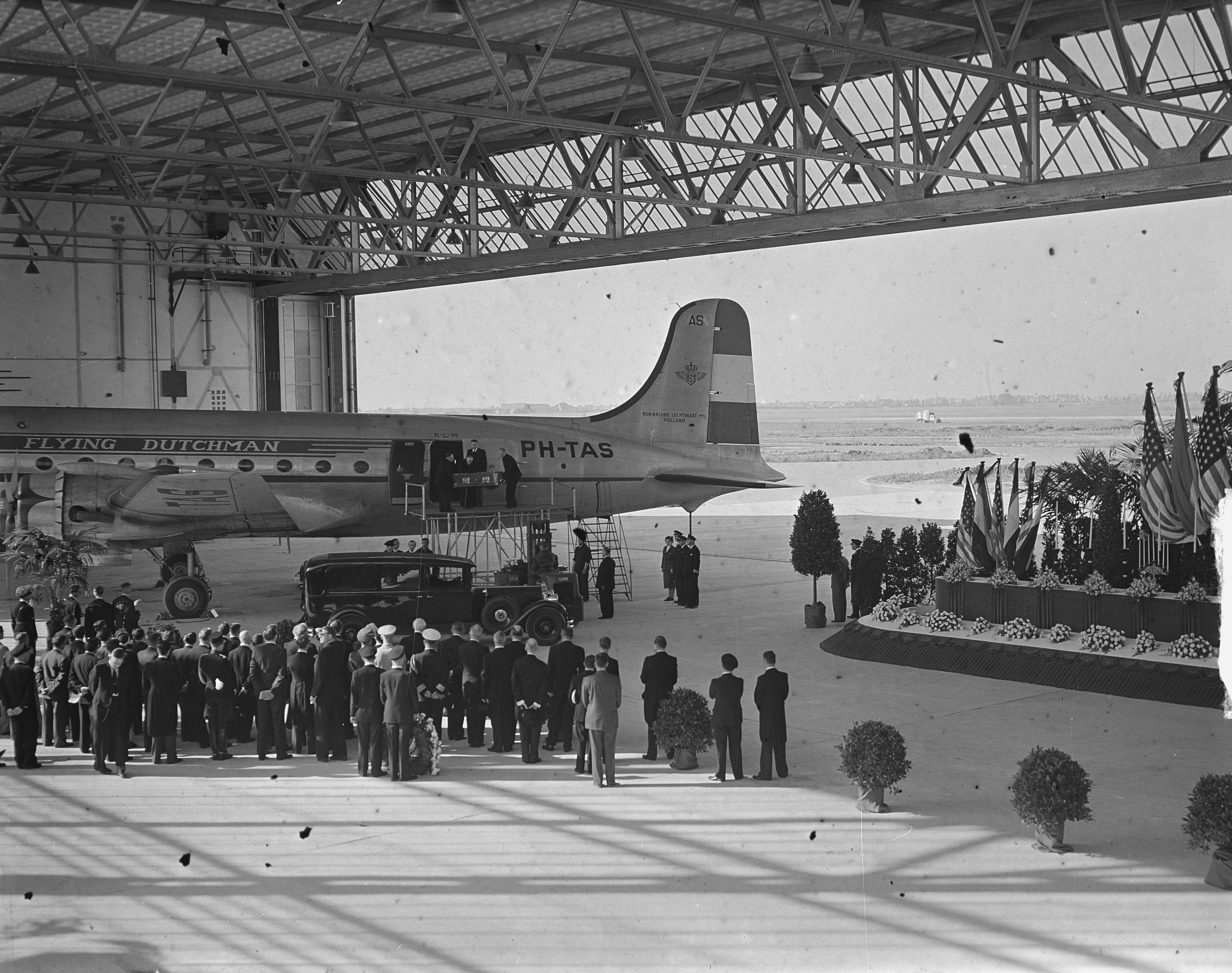
Arrival of bodies of the Dutch victims in the Netherlands.

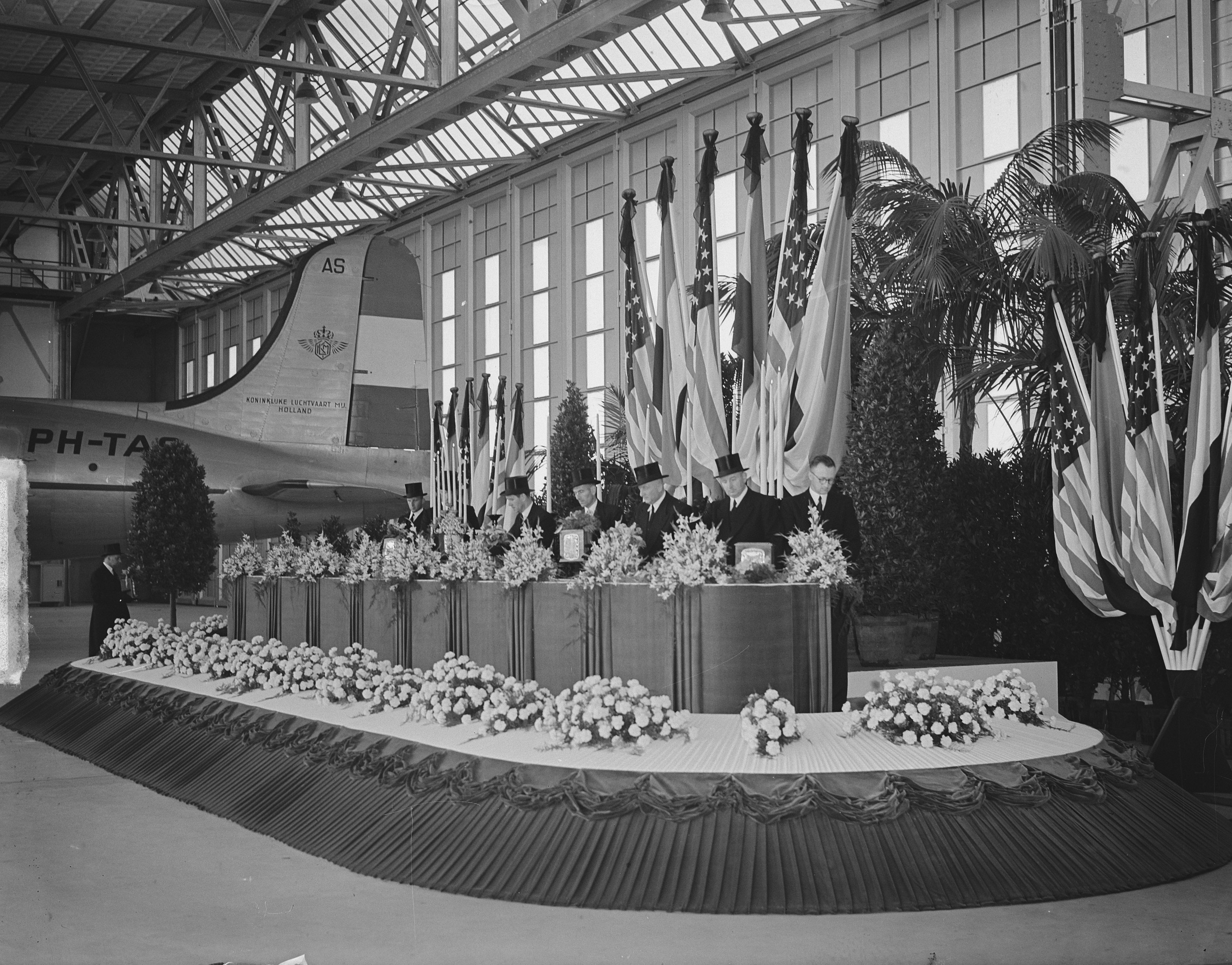
Remembrance of the Dutch victims upon arrival in the Netherlands

The remains of the victims were repatriated to the Netherlands later in July 1949. Funeral ceremonies were held in multiple locations, and several crew members were buried in Dutch cemeteries, including Westerveld Cemetery in Driehuis.

Memorial services were also held for the American journalists, whose remains were returned to the United States. The disaster received significant international attention due to their presence on board.

=== Investigation ===
The official investigation concluded that the crash was primarily caused by pilot error in combination with adverse weather conditions. The crew had continued the approach below safe minima in unfamiliar terrain.

Investigators also criticized air traffic control for providing potentially unsafe instructions, including directing the aircraft toward a runway approach path obstructed by terrain under the prevailing weather conditions.

Some irregularities were noted in records, including altered or incomplete log entries, which led to later speculation about the accuracy of the official findings.

=== Sabotage theories ===
Speculation about possible sabotage emerged soon after the crash, partly due to the political context of the flight and the presence of influential American journalists. Some theories suggested deliberate misinformation from air traffic control or interference linked to Indonesian or international actors.

Decades later, individuals associated with intelligence services alleged indirect evidence of foul play, including claims of intercepted communications between Indian and Indonesian officials. However, these claims have not been substantiated.

Most historians and investigators consider sabotage unlikely, attributing the disaster to operational errors and severe weather conditions.
