= Ernest Sheepshanks =

English cricketer and journalist (1910–1937)

Ernest Richard Sheepshanks (22 March 1910 – 31 December 1937), also known as Dick Sheepshanks, was an English amateur first-class cricketer who played one match for Yorkshire County Cricket Club in 1929, and a war correspondent who was killed in the Spanish Civil War.

== Personal ==
Sheepshanks was born at Arthington Hall, Leeds, Yorkshire, England. His family had made its fortune in wool. He is buried in the churchyard at Arthington Hall.

== Education and sports ==
Sheepshanks attended Eton College, where he was captain of cricket, and helped them win the annual fixture against Harrow School in 1928. He then studied at Trinity College, Cambridge, from 1928 to 1931, where he was a contemporary of Victor Rothschild and Guy Burgess.

It was in his first year at Cambridge, in 1929, that he played for Yorkshire County Cricket Club against the University, although he never played for Cambridge University itself. Sheepshanks, as a right-handed batsman, scored 26 in his only innings. After following on, Cambridge scored 425 for 7 and the match was drawn.

== Journalism career ==
Sheepshanks joined Reuters as a journalist on 16 October 1933. He died, aged 27, in December 1937 at Caudiel, Teruel, Spain, where he was working as a special correspondent at the Battle of Teruel in the Spanish Civil War, covering the war from a pro-Franco position. A shell landed just in front of the press car he was in; Bradish Johnson of Newsweek was killed outright, Eddie Neil of Associated Press and Sheepshanks were fatally wounded, but Kim Philby of The Times, much later exposed as a Soviet spy, suffered only a minor head wound.

== Controversy ==
Decades later Tom Duprée, British honorary consul at Saint Jean de Luz, France in 1937, suggested Philby had set a bomb in the car to kill Sheepshanks before he blew his cover, but Professor Donald Read considered this highly improbable.
