= Helen Kirkpatrick =

American war correspondent (1909–1997)

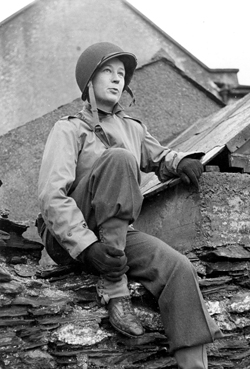
- Kirkpatrick in 1944
- Born: October 18, 1909; Rochester, New York, U.S.
- Died: December 29, 1997 (aged 88); Williamsburg, Virginia, U.S.
- Education: Smith College
- Occupation: Journalist
- Spouses: Victor H. Polacheck Jr. (m. 1934–1936) Robbins Milbank (m. 1954–1985)

Helen Kirkpatrick (October 18, 1909 – December 29, 1997) was an American war correspondent during the Second World War.

== Early life and career pre-World War II ==
Born in Rochester, New York, she graduated from The Masters School in Dobbs Ferry, New York and Smith College in 1931 and also obtained a degree in International Law from the University of Geneva and the Graduate Institute of International Studies. Returning to New York she worked at Macy's where she met her first husband, Victor H. Polacheck, Jr. In 1935 she returned to Europe working as a reporter for New York Herald Tribune in France; and after moving to the United Kingdom in 1937, worked as a freelance reporter for a number of newspapers including The Manchester Guardian, The Daily Telegraph as well as the New York Herald Tribune. During the Munich Crisis she was temporarily a diplomatic correspondent for the Sunday Times.

During her period in London, Kirkpatrick, along with two other journalists — Victor Gordon-Lennox and Graham Hutton — published a weekly newspaper The Whitehall News which was staunchly anti-appeasement and in opposition to the dictatorships in Germany and Italy. Among the politicians who read The Whitehall News were the then British Foreign Secretary Anthony Eden (later to resign over the British government's attitude to appeasement) and Winston Churchill. Kirkpatrick expanded upon her anti-appeasement views in two books published in 1938 and 1939 — This Terrible Peace and Under the British Umbrella: What the English are and how they go to war.

== Second World War ==
In 1939 Kirkpatrick applied to become a reporter on the staff of the Chicago Daily News. The proprietor of the paper, Frank Knox, told her "We don't have women on the staff" to which Kirkpatrick replied "I can't change my sex. But you can change your policy." Knox hired her. Her first assignment for the paper was to interview the Duke of Windsor, well known for not giving interviews. Kirkpatrick managed to arrange a meeting with the Duke who explained to her that he did not give interviews but had no objection to him interviewing her. This resulted in the first piece under her byline being an interview of her by the Duke of Windsor.

Kirkpatrick remained with the Chicago Daily News throughout the war. She was based in London and reported on the London Blitz and in 1943 accompanied the US Army to Algeria and the Mediterranean theater. Returning to England she accompanied the American forces during the Invasion of Normandy in June 1944 before becoming attached to the Free French Forces, the first war correspondent to be so assigned. In August 1944 she rode with the tanks of General Leclerc's 2nd Armored Division as the division liberated Paris. Afterwards, she became the Daily News' Paris Bureau Chief and a short time later, went on to report from Germany.

Her final wartime assignment was to visit Berchtesgaden — Hitler's mountain retreat in Bavaria where it is reported that she stole a frying pan from the kitchen.

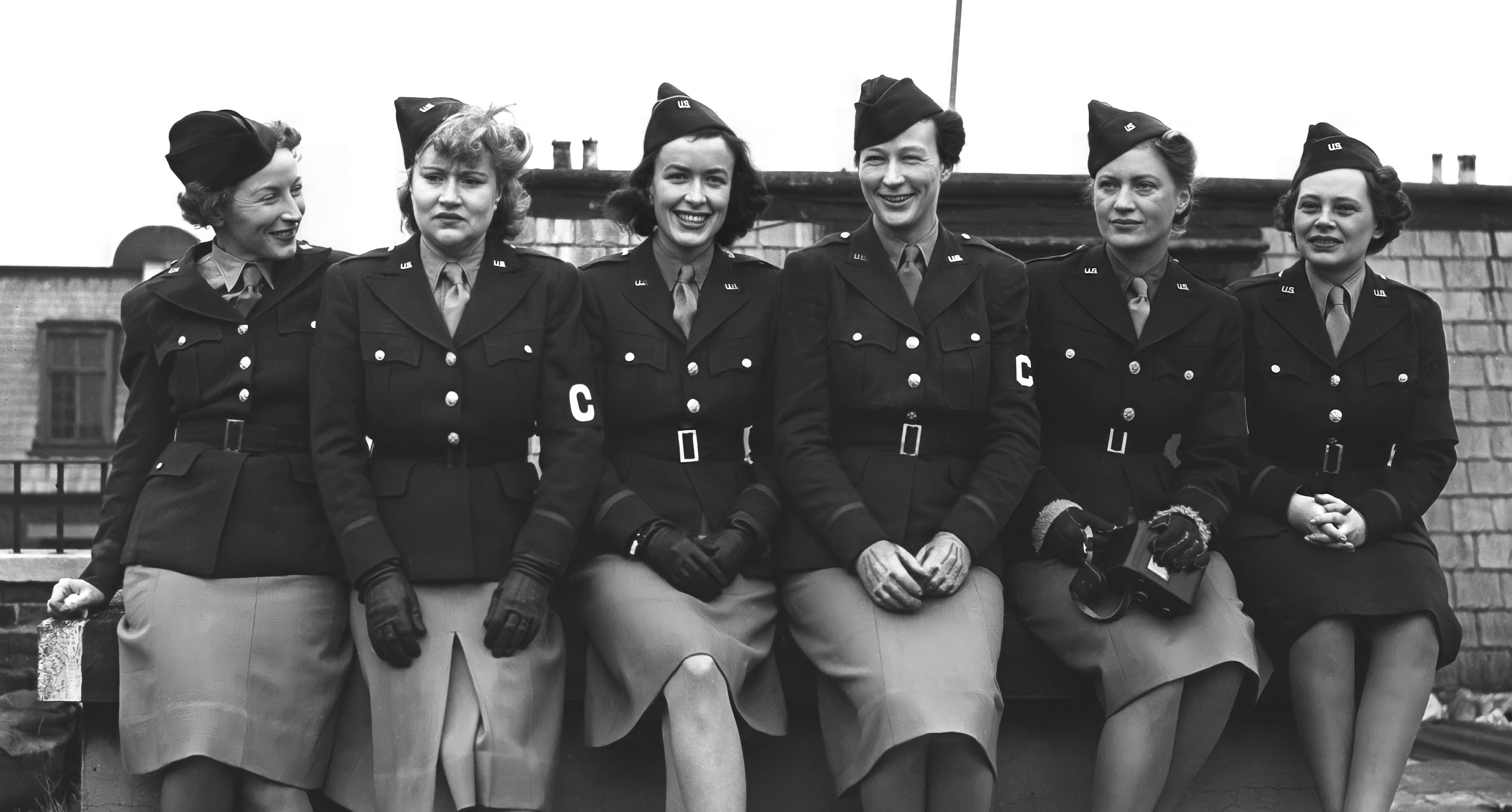
Kirkpatrick in 1943 with other female war correspondents who covered the U.S. Army in the European Theater during World War II; from left to right: Mary Welsh, Dixie Tighe, Kathleen Harriman, Helen Kirkpatrick, Lee Miller, and Tania Long

== Post-war career ==
By 1946 Kirkpatrick had left the Chicago Daily News and joined the New York Post for which paper she covered the Nuremberg Trials and secured one of the first interviews with Jawaharlal Nehru, the first prime minister of India.

Leaving journalism to work as an information officer for the Marshall Plan before returning to Washington, D.C. to work for an Advisor to Secretaty of State Dean Acheson in the European Bureau of the State Department between 1949 and 1953, Kirkpatrick then finally became secretary to the President of Smith College, her alma mater.

After retirement she was engaged in a number of civic activities, many of which were on behalf of the Democratic Party.

== Personal life and death ==
Kirkpatrick divorced her first husband, Victor Polacheck, in 1936 and in 1954 married Robbins Milbank, a trustee of Smith College. She remained married to Milbank until his death in 1985. Between 1983 and 1993, Kirkpatrick began gifting her papers to the Sophia Smith Collection, Smith College Special Collections.

After retirement to Williamsburg, Virginia, Kirkpatrick died on December 29, 1997.

== Honors ==
For her wartime services, Kirkpatrick was awarded the Medal of Freedom, the French Legion of Honour and the Médaille de la Reconnaissance française and in later life the Rockefeller Public Service Award for her work for the US Government.
