= Louis Delaprée =

French journalist

Louis Delaprée (20 April 1902 - 8 December 1936) was a French screenwriter, journalist and war correspondent in Madrid for the newspaper Paris-Soir during the Spanish Civil War.

Paris-Soir had National/Rebel sympathies and Louis Delaprée's articles reporting the horror of the National bombings over the city were not too well received. He eventually renounced his position at the newspaper. The last article he wrote, under the title (borrowed from Émile Zola) "J’accuse...!", ended with the following sentence:

"Christ has said: Forgive them, for they do not know what they are doing. I think, after the Massacre of the Innocents (perpetrated) in Madrid, we should say: Do not forgive them, for they (the National side) do know what they are doing!"

After resigning, he died in a plane crash near Guadalajara, Spain in unclear circumstances that have given room to speculation. He was posthumously made a Knight of the Legion of Honor. After his death, Antoine de Saint-Exupéry replaced him as Paris-Soir's correspondent in Spain.

In 1933, he was co-screenwriter, with Julien Duvivier and Pierre Caldmann, of La Tête d'un homme, a film adaptation of the novel of the same name by Georges Simenon.
