= Noel Monks =

Australian journalist (1907–1960)

Noel Monks (1907–1960) was an Australian-born war correspondent who spent most of his career working for British newspapers. At the time of his death, he was court correspondent for the Daily Mail. After his death, he was described in the Sunday Dispatch as "one of the greatest reporters of our day."

Monks was married several times, including to the American journalist Mary Welsh, who divorced him to marry Ernest Hemingway.

== Sources ==
- "Mr. Noel Monks", The Times, 20 June 1960, p. 16
- https://halloffame.melbournepressclub.com/article/noel-monks
