= Karlstads-Tidningen =

Swedish newspaper

Karlstads-Tidningen (KT) (meaning "The Karlstad-Newspaper" in English) is a liberal newspaper which is released in Karlstad, Sweden.

== History and profile ==
The newspaper was first published on 15 November 1879, then called Karlstads Tidning. During the Spanish Civil War, Karin Kajsa Rothman was a frequent contributor with news from the front lines.

In 2001 Karlstads-Tidningen was bought up by Värmlands Folkblad (VF).

Karlstads-Tidningen has a liberal political leaning.
