= Hubert Renfro Knickerbocker =

American journalist and author (1898–1949)

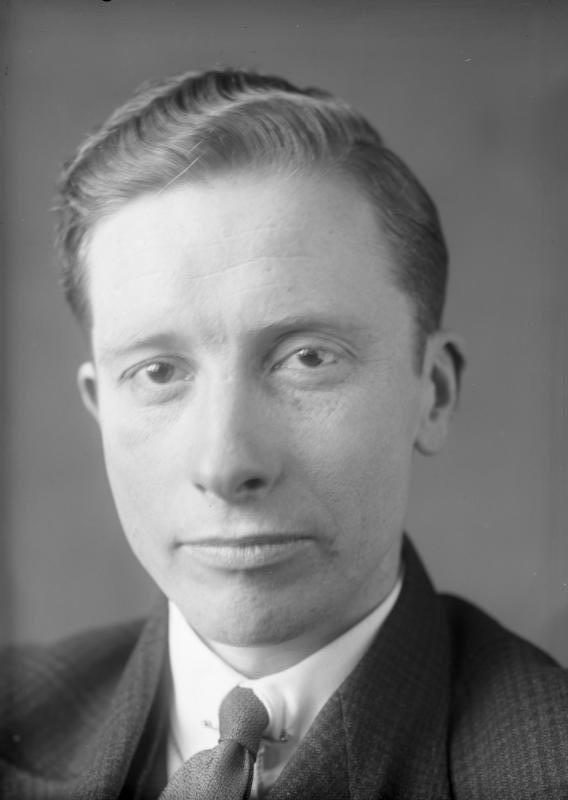
- Hubert Renfro Knickerbocker
- Born: January 31, 1898; Yoakum, Texas, U.S.
- Died: July 12, 1949 (aged 51); Ghatkopar, Mumbai, India
- Education: Southwestern University, Columbia University
- Occupations: journalist, writer
- Spouses: Laura Knickerbocker, Agnes Knickerbocker (July 1935 - July 1949)
- Parent(s): Hubert Delancey Knickerbocker and Julia Catherine Knickerbocker (née Opdenweyer)

Signature
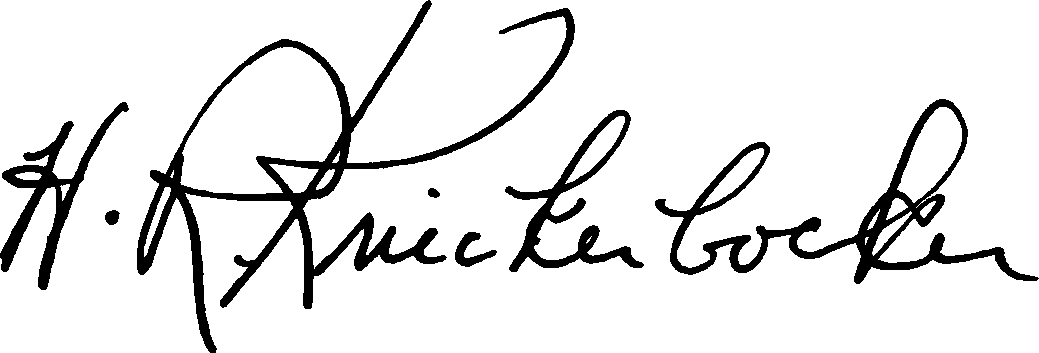

Hubert Renfro Knickerbocker (January 31, 1898 – July 12, 1949) was an American journalist and author; winner of the 1931 Pulitzer Prize for Correspondence for his series of articles on the practical operation of the Five Year Plan in the Soviet Union. He was nicknamed "Red" from the color of his hair.

He was one of the 13 journalists killed in the India KLM Lockheed L-749 air disaster.

== Early life ==
Knickerbocker was born in Yoakum, Texas, to Rev. Hubert Delancey Knickerbocker and Julia Catherine Knickerbocker (née Opdenweyer). He attended Southwestern University before serving in the army for a few months as a telegraph operator. In 1919, he moved to Columbia University to pursue medicine, but his financial constraints allowed him only to study journalism. He completed the program in 1921.

== Education ==
Knickerbocker graduated from the Southwestern University in Texas and then studied journalism at Columbia University.

== Career ==
Knickerbocker was a journalist, noted for reporting on German politics before and during World War II. From 1923 to 1933 he reported from Berlin, but because of his opposition to Adolf Hitler he was deported when Hitler came to power. On December 1, 1930, Knickerbocker interviewed Soviet leader Joseph Stalin's mother, Keke Geladze, in Tbilisi for the New York Evening Post through a Georgian interpreter. The article was titled “Stalin Mystery Man Even to His Mother.”

In 1932 he traveled across Europe for the book Does Europe Recover. He interviewed many state leaders, amongst them Benito Mussolini, and the second-most important person of Germany's NSDAP Party, Gregor Strasser. His report on Italian fascism is full of praise for the regime's "stability". He also praises Strasser's "left wing" of NSDAP party and the Papen government's semi-dictatorship. There is no hint of a warning about Nazism in the book but rather a recommendation for its success in Italy.

Back in America, after Hitler's reign of terror became the face of NSDAP, he began writing about the threat of Nazism. On April 15, 1933, he wrote in the New York Evening Post: "An indeterminate number of Jews have been killed. Hundreds of Jews have been beaten or tortured. Thousands of Jews have fled. Thousands of Jews have been, or will be, deprived of their livelihood." In 1931, as a correspondent for the New York Evening Post and the Philadelphia Public Ledger, he won the Pulitzer Prize for "a series of articles on the practical operation of the Five Year Plan in Russia".

In 1936 he covered the Spanish Civil War for the Hearst Press group. Like other foreign reporters, his work was progressively hampered by the rebel authorities, who finally arrested Knickerbocker in April 1937 and deported him shortly after. Back to the United States, he wrote an article for the Washington Times, published on 10 May 1937, in which he exposed the brutal repression and the "antisemite, misogynist and antidemocratic" society that the Nationalists planned to develop, according to the statements by Francoist Foreign Press Liaison Officer Gonzalo de Aguilera Munro. The next day, Congressman Jerry J. O'Connell cited the article extensively in the House of Representatives due to the concern generated.

After World War II, Knickerbocker went to work for radio station WOR, in Newark, New Jersey. He was on assignment with a team of journalists touring Southeast Asia when they were all killed in the India KLM Lockheed L-749 air disaster near Bombay, India (modern day Mumbai), on July 12, 1949.

== Personal life ==
Knickerbocker was married first to Laura Patrick in 1918, and they had one son, Conrad (1929-1966), who became a daily book reviewer for The New York Times. Conrad married Mary Hill, with whom he had daughter Laura Knickerbocker, and later married Margaret Ann Nolan, with whom he had 2 sons, Thomas Knickerbocker and Patrick Knickerbocker. H R Knickerbocker’s second marriage was to Agnes Schjoldager, with whom he had three daughters, Julia (1936-1993), Miranda (1937-2024), who married actor Sorrell Booke, and Suzanne (b 1942). Grandchildren: (by Julia Knickerbocker LaMuniere) Noelle LaMuniere, Suzanne LaMuniere; (by Miranda Knickerbocker Booke) Alexandra Booke, Nicholas Booke; (by Suzanne Knickerbocker Nelson) Andrea Nelson, Trevor Nelson) and later (by Suzanne Knickerbocker Colt) Angela Colt, Tristan Colt.

== Major publications ==
- Fighting the Red Trade Menace (1931)
- The New Russia (1931)
- Soviet Trade and World Depression (1931)
- The Soviet Five Year Plan and Its Effect on World Trade (1931)
- Can Europe Recover? (1932)
- German Crises (1932)
- Germany-Fascist or Soviet? (1932)
- The Truth about Hitlerism (1933)
- The Boiling Point: Will War Come in Europe? (1934)
- Is Tomorrow Hitler’s? 200 Questions On The Battle of Mankind (1941)
