= Robert Neville (journalist) =

American newspaper and magazine reporter

Robert G. M. Neville (May 12, 1905 – February 17, 1970) was an American newspaper and magazine reporter who, in a 40-year career, covered the Spanish Civil War, World War II and the Korean War, working for The New York Times, New York Post, New York Herald Tribune, PM and, starting in 1937, Time magazine, where he remained for two and, subsequently, 13 years, rising in 1938 to become the publication's foreign news editor.

== Background ==
A native of Oklahoma, Robert Neville was born on a ranch near the small city of Vinita, to Missourians Oliver D. Neville and Lavona A. Neville. They subsequently moved with his family to Wyoming where, living in another small city, Gillette, he worked, at the age of 14, as a hand typesetter for a local newspaper. Starting his higher education at the University of California and then transferring to New York City for a Bachelor of Literature degree at Columbia University, he obtained a Master's degree from Columbia School of Journalism in 1929.

== Career ==
While studying for his degrees and for three years after receiving his Master's, he worked as a reporter for The Times, then for the Post and eventually for the Herald Tribune which, in 1936, sent him to Spain for coverage of the civil war which had just erupted there. Some of his battlefield reports were also published in liberal weekly The New Republic.

By 1937, after nearly a year in Spain, Neville was back in New York, changing his working environment from that of a daily newspaper to the weekly newsmagazine Time which, the following year, promoted him to the position of foreign news editor. Frequently traveling to the Polish capital, Warsaw, in the tense months preceding the outbreak of World War II, he witnessed, on September 1, 1939, the first day of the war, as Hitler's army invaded Poland. In 1940, William Saroyan lists him among "contributing editors" at Time in the play, Love's Old Sweet Song.

Coming back again to New York, Neville decided on a return to daily newspaper work, joining, as one of the initial reporters, the newly founded (in June 1940) leftist afternoon daily PM, which did not accept advertising and resembled a weekly newsmagazine in its reliance on large photographs and stapled pages. Offered the same position he held at Time, foreign news editor, Neville remained with PM until December 1941 when, in the aftermath of the Pearl Harbor attack, he entered the Army as a private, at the age of 36. Quickly promoted to staff sergeant and receiving an assignment to the publications division, he was sent to North Africa where he became a co-founder of the Armed Forces newspaper Stars and Stripes edition covering the Mediterranean and Middle East theatre of World War II. After the liberation of Rome, the paper moved its headquarters to the Italian capital where Neville, now holding the rank of captain, with quick future promotions to major and then lieutenant colonel, served as its editor and publications officer.

In January 1946, eight months following the end of the war in Europe, Neville gave up his Army commission for civilian life in New York, but soon thereafter decided on a return to Europe, rejoining Time as its Rome bureau chief. It was also in Rome, that a year later, at the age of 42, Neville married Italian Maria Sentinelli.

Continuing to report from abroad, Neville was subsequently appointed as chief of Time–Life bureaus in Istanbul, Hong Kong, Buenos Aires and New Delhi, but ultimately deciding to live permanently in Rome, retiring from the publishing conglomerate in 1959, when he was 54. Continuing to work as a freelance writer, he authored The World of the Vatican, a 1962 book which examined the workings of the city-state's government, as well as contributing numerous articles to diverse publications, including Encounter, Harper's, Look, as well as The New York Times Magazine and The New York Times Book Review, Sunday supplements of his earliest employer during the late 1920s and early 1930s.

== Personal and death ==
In 1967, during a skiing vacation in Switzerland, Robert Neville suffered a debilitating stroke which greatly diminished his writing ability and undermined his health, ultimately leading to his death three years later in Rome where, on February 19, 1970, two days after his death, a funeral service was held at St. Paul's Within the Walls Episcopal Church. He was 64 years old and was survived by his wife.
