= Roger Tamraz =

American businessman (born 1940)

Roger Edward Tamraz (Arabic: روجيه تمرز) is an international banker and venture capital investor who has had an active business career in oil and gas in Europe, Asia and North America since the early 1960s. He is the billionaire chairman of the Dubai, UAE-based petroleum energy firm NetOil.

Tamraz is featured in the book See No Evil, which loosely inspired the film Syriana.

== Early life and education ==
Born 1940 in Cairo, Egypt to Lebanese parents. Tamraz grew up speaking fluent English, French and Arabic. His early schooling was at the prestigious English School in Cairo. He subsequently attended the American University in Cairo, Cambridge University in a Ph.D. programme, and the Institut Européen d’Administration (INSEAD) in Fontainebleau, France. He received an MBA in 1966 from Harvard Business School, where his classmates included many future leaders in Western and international governments and businesses.

Tamraz served for many years as a member of the Board of Trustees of the American University in Cairo, where he endowed a number of named scholarships for Egyptian students of exceptional promise. He became a U.S. citizen in 1989.

== International finance, oil, and gas ==
Tamraz's first notable business enterprise was in 1967, when as an executive of the Wall Street investment bank Kidder, Peabody & Co., he successfully refloated a large Lebanese bank called Intra Bank, which had become insolvent in 1966. The bank had been founded in Beirut in 1951 by Yousef Beidas and three partners as a currency trading house named International Traders. The bank stopped payments on October 14, 1966. The collapse of the bank brought the Lebanese economy to a halt and sent shockwaves throughout the Middle East. Intra Bank accounted for 15% of total bank deposits and 38% of all deposits with Lebanese-owned banks. It owned nine other banks, controlled 35 companies and employed 43,000 people at the time of its collapse.

The collapse was followed by its restructuring, under a plan known as the “Kidder Peabody Plan,” which was engineered by Tamraz (who served for years as its chairman and chief executive officer), under which the deposit obligations of the old Intra Bank were replaced with shares in a new company named Intra Investment Company (IIC), one of the major sovereign wealth investment companies in the Middle East. The major shareholders of IIC were the Lebanese government, along with the governments of Kuwait, Qatar and the United States, all of which had been major depositors in the former bank. IIC remained a major shareholder in key institutions such as Middle East Airlines (Tamraz was the Vice Chairman of the airline for a number of years, with special responsibility for its finances, banking relationships and aircraft purchases), Casino du Liban and Bank Al Mashreq, which carried out the remaining banking operations. Kidder Peabody continued to advise the board of IIC until 1973 under an advisory contract, at which time the relationship was discontinued.

After leaving Intra Bank in the early 1970s, Tamraz continued his investment banking activities, dealing with most major companies and governments in the area. His early background gave him an unusual ability to bridge East and West, while his educational background and fluency in Arabic quickly made him a trusted banker and adviser throughout the Middle East. Tamraz leveraged his close connections with President of Lebanon Amine Gemayel to grow his financial success during the 1980s.

Working with the government of Kuwait, he reorganized Gulf Fisheries, a company with over 200 ocean-going fishing vessels worldwide, and supervised and priced its takeover by the Kuwaiti government. At the same time, he also worked with Egypt Air and the Egyptian government to completely re-equip the airline’s fleet with new Boeing passenger aircraft.

Tamraz acquired ownership of Chantiers Navals de la Ciotat (CNC), the second-largest shipyard in France, in the early 1970s. This company was one of the early pioneers in the construction of LNG vessels for oceangoing natural gas transport, and also specialized in submarines, patrol boats and other military platforms. In addition, the yard constructed very large crude carriers (VLCC5) and conventional bulk cargo vessels for the civilian maritime industry.

In the 1970s, Tamraz conceived, financed and built the well-known 200-mile (320 km) long Suez-Mediterranean (SUMED) Pipeline in Egypt, considered as “one of the world’s greatest engineering feats”, a pipeline designed to run parallel to the blocked Suez Canal, which had been closed since the 1967 Arab-Israeli war. Using Bechtel Corporation as prime contractor, the pipeline, which comprises two parallel 42-inch lines, was opened in 1978 with a capacity of 1.6 million barrels per day (250,000 m^{3}/d). Completion of an additional pumping station in 1994 increased capacity to its current 2.5 million barrels per day (400,000 m^{3}/d).

Concurrently with the SUMED project, Tamraz conceived and financed the world’s largest chemical methanol plant in Jubail, Saudi Arabia in partnership with Japan’s Itochu Corporation and Mitsubishi Heavy Industries. Tamraz continued subsequently as an advisor to Itochu senior management, especially on Middle East energy strategy. The methanol project included a five-year, 100-million-barrels (16,000,000 m^{3}) preferential crude oil supply contract for Japan that was signed with the Saudi government during the 1973 oil crisis.

In 1976, Tamraz moved into United States financial markets with his acquisition of Bank of the Commonwealth, a Michigan-based bank with 50 branches. He strengthened and expanded the bank until 1983, when it was merged into the founding of Comerica, Inc., now one of the largest super-regional U.S. bank holding companies. The merger made Tamraz the largest single shareholder in Comerica at the time, before selling out to finance the Tamoil acquisition described below. Comerica currently has assets of $64 billion and a market capitalization of $5.6 billion.

By the early 1980s, Tamraz became the 100% owner of the Meurice Hotel Group in Paris, which owned the Meurice (Hôtel Meurice, Prince de Galles and Grand Hotels, as well as the famed Cafe de la Paix. At the time, the 1,000 rooms of these three hotels comprised 25% of all the luxury hotel rooms in Paris. The properties were sold to Grand Metropolitan Hotel Corporation of London in the mid-1980s.

In 1986-1987, during the Lebanese Civil War, Tamraz cooperated with the Lebanese Forces militia to construct an airport in Halat.

Also during the 1980s, Tamraz founded and built Europe’s Tamoil Corporation by purchasing and combining all of the Italian assets of Amoco (Standard Oil Company of Indiana) and of Texaco Corporation (1,000 service stations each). Prior to selling, he expanded the company to 3,000 service stations, three refineries, an extensive pipeline distribution system and a refining capacity of 250,000 barrels (40,000 m^{3}) of oil per day. Tamoil today has annual sales of $20 billion and a market capitalization of $6.3 billion.

In the early 1990s, after the Soviet Union loosened its grip on Central Asia, Tamraz was the originator of the 1,100-mile (1,800 km) Baku-Ceyhan (Baku-Tbilisi-Ceyhan pipeline) considered as “one of the great engineering endeavours”, an oil pipeline project, to move 1 million barrels per day (160,000 m^{3}/d) of Caspian Sea oil to the Mediterranean Sea and thus to world markets. Tamraz managed to obtain support for the proposed pipeline from Turkmen President Niyazov, Azerbaijan's President Heydar Aliyev, and Turkey's Prime Minister, Tansu Çiller, and Turkey's Botas company. Tamraz's companies negotiated and signed the original pipeline right-of-way transit agreement with the Government of Turkey. This agreement was essential to the success of the project, which was eventually completed by BP after its purchase of Amoco, with which Tamraz had been cooperating in the Central Asian area. During this period, Tamraz acquired equity ownership positions in Turkmenistan’s Blocks I and II two of that country’s major oil and gas producing properties. These fields have reserves of 13 trillion cubic feet (370 km^{3}) of gas and 700 million barrels (110,000,000 m^{3}) of oil, with 1,400 working wells, and currently produce two billion cubic feet per day of natural gas.

Roger Tamraz’s Netoil group of companies has been in discussions with Libya to buy back Tamoil

== Congressional hearings and pipeline lobbying ==
Tamraz was involved in United States congressional hearings on campaign finance in 1997-1998 after giving $300,000 to the Bill Clinton campaign, which he admitted was to gain greater access. Tamraz was said to have pitched the White House on a pipeline proposal. The pipeline would have run through Armenia and Turkey in Central Asia, and the disputed area of Nagorno-Karabakh in Azerbaijan, but ran into resistance from Heydar Aliyev.

== Fraud and embezzlement allegations ==
In 1997, Tamraz was detained by the Republic of Georgia on a warrant from INTERPOL for embezzlement of $200 million. The charges originated from the Lebanese government and were pertaining to the collapse of the Al Mashreq Bank in 1989. Tamraz was not extradited or detained by the US, despite the warrant, but was briefly considered an international fugitive, though he stated he was "allowed to travel freely throughout the world." Tamraz was also charged with "bank fraud, conflict of interest and abuse of trust" in France in 1997. Tamraz denied the charges, calling them fabricated, and stated that they stemmed from politics in Lebanon. Tamraz has asserted that an auditor, "the Lebanese court-appointed investigator," and "C.I.A. agents" had declared him innocent.
