= Bibliography of the Kent State shootings =

This is a bibliography on the Kent State shootings. External links to reports, news articles and other sources of information may also be found below.

== Books ==
- Agte, Barbara Becker, (2012), Kent Letters: Students' Responses to the May 1970 Massacre. Deming, New Mexico: Bluewaters Press ISBN 978-0-9823766-6-9
- Caputo, Philip. (2005). 13 Seconds: A Look Back at the Kent State Shootings with DVD. New York: Chamberlain Bros. ISBN 1-59609-080-4.
- Davies, Peter and the Board of Church and Society of the United Methodist Church. (1973). The Truth About Kent State: A Challenge to the American Conscience. New York: Farrar, Straus & Giroux. ISBN 0-374-27938-1.
- Eszterhas, Joe, and Roberts, Michael D. (1970). Thirteen Seconds: Confrontation at Kent State. New York: Dodd, Mead. ISBN 978-1-938441-11-0.
- Gordon, William A. (1990). The Fourth of May: Killings and Coverups at Kent State. Buffalo, NY: Prometheus Books. ISBN 0-87975-582-2. Updated and reprinted in 1995 as Four Dead in Ohio: Was There a Conspiracy at Kent State? Laguna Hills, California: North Ridge Books. ISBN 0-937813-05-2.
- Giles, Robert (2020). When Truth Mattered: The Kent State Shootings 50 Years Later. Traverse City, MI: Mission Point Press. ISBN 1950659429
- Grace, Thomas M. (2016). Kent State: Death and Dissent in the Long Sixties. Amherst, MA: University of Massachusetts Press. ISBN 978-1-62534-111-2.
- Hensley, Thomas R. and Lewis, Jerry M. (2010), Kent State and May 4th A Social Science Perspective 3rd Edition. Kent, Ohio: The Kent State University Press. ISBN 978-1-60635-048-5
- Kelner, Joseph and Munves, James, The Kent State Coverup, New York: Harper & Row. ISBN 0-06-012282-X.
- Means, Howard. (2016). 67 Shots: Kent State and the End of American Innocence. Boston: Da Capo Press. ISBN 978-0-306-82379-4.
- Michener, James. (1971). Kent State: What Happened and Why. New York: Random House and Reader's Digest Books. ISBN 0-394-47199-7.
- Morrison, Joan; Morrison, Robert K. (1987). From Camelot to Kent State: The Sixties Experience in the Words of Those who Lived It. Times Books. ISBN 978-0-81291-715-4. Excerpt
- Payne, J. Gregory. (1981). Mayday: Kent State. Dubuque, IA: Kendall/Hunt Pub. Co. ISBN 0-8403-2393-X.
- Ruffner, Howard. (2019). Moments of Truth - A Photographer's Experience at Kent State 1970. Kent, OH: The Kent State University Press. ISBN 978-1-60635-367-7
- Simpson, Craig S., and Wilson, Gregory S.. (2016). Above the Shots: An Oral History of the Kent State Shootings. Kent, OH: The Kent State University Press. ISBN 978-1-606-35291-5.
- Stone, I. F. (1970). The Killings at Kent State: How Murder Went Unpunished, in series, New York Review Book[s]. New York: distributed by Vintage Books. N.B.: The second printing also includes copyrighted material dated 1971. ISBN 0-394-70953-5.
- VanDeMark, Brian. (2024). Kent State: An American Tragedy. New York: W. W. Norton & Company. ISBN 978-1324066255.
- Weissman, Norman. (2008). Snapshots USA. Mystic, Connecticut: Hammonasset House Books. ISBN 0-9801894-1-1.

== Articles ==
- Lewis, Jerry M.; Hensley, Thomas R. (Summer 1998). "The May 4 Shootings at Kent State University: The Search for Historical Accuracy". The Ohio Council for the Social Studies Review. 34 (1): 9–21. Archived from the original on May 9, 2008.
- Listman, John W. Jr. (May 2000). "Kent's Other Casualties". National Guard. Archived from the original on November 9, 2007 – via FindArticles.
- Stone, I. F. "Fabricated Evidence in the Kent State Killings", The New York Review of Books, Volume 15, Number December 10, 3 1970.
- WKSU News: Newly-Enhanced Audio Tape May Reveal Order to Fire on Kent State Students, Former Student Who Was Shot Calling for Investigation, Tuesday, May 1, 2007 – with audio links
- Remembering Kent State shooting victims By Jim Mackinnon, Akron Beacon Journal writer, May 5, 2008 – Scott Ritter speaks at 2008 commemoration
- Newspaper article archives:
  - Kent State tragedy: Reflecting on May 4, 1970 (the Akron Beacon Journal)
  - Kent State Shootings 40th Anniversary (The Plain Dealer of Cleveland)

== Films ==
- 1970: Confrontation at Kent State (director Richard Myers) – documentary filmed by a Kent State University filmmaker in Kent, Ohio, directly following the shootings.
- 1981: Kent State (director James Goldstone) – television docudrama.
- 2000: Kent State: The Day the War Came Home (director Chris Triffo, executive producer Mark Mori), the Emmy-Award-winning documentary featuring interviews with injured students, eyewitnesses, guardsmen, and relatives of students killed at Kent State.
- 2007: 4 Tote in Ohio: Ein Amerikanisches Trauma ("4 dead in Ohio: an American trauma") (directors Klaus Bredenbrock and Pagonis Pagonakis) – documentary featuring interviews with injured students, eyewitnesses and a German journalist who was a U.S. correspondent.
- 2008: How It Was: Kent State Shootings – National Geographic Channel documentary series episode.
- 2010: Fire In the Heartland: Kent State, May 4, and Student Protest in America (director Daniel Lee Miller) – documentary featuring the build-up to, the events of, and the aftermath of the shootings, told by many of those who were present and in some cases wounded.

== Reports ==
- President's Commission on Campus Unrest ("Scranton Commission")

== Websites ==
- Kent State University webpages
  - Kent State University, Department of Special Collections & Archives: May 4 Collection
  - Kent State University May 4, 1970 Resource Page (archived)
  - Kent State University May 4, 1970, Online Newsroom (archived)
  - Kent State University 40 May 4 Commemoration Events Listing – 2010 anniversary events at KSU (archived)
- Mapping May 4 – map of stories from the oral history collection
- May 4 Task Force home page
- Vietnam War Song Project: Kent State Songs By Justin Brummer (UCL)
- May4Archive.org – maintained by author J. Gregory Payne
- FBI file on the Kent State shootings
- Terry Norman
  - FBI Files online
  - Kent State Terry Norman
- Eyewitness: Howard Ruffner
- Repository of Oral Histories of the Kent State Shootings
- Kent State shooting scrapbook
- Links, photos, music and eyewitness reports about the shootings at Kent State.
- AlanCanfora.com – personal website of one of the survivors; historical information, photographs, and commentary.
- May4.org – A 501(c)(3) non-profit educational charity about the Kent State Shootings.
- Kent State Remembered – A collection of articles regarding the Kent State Protest.
- Mike and Kendra's Kent State, May 4, 1970 web site – Detailing the commemoration process and related controversies and providing sources for research.
- Kent State 1970: Information Repository by WKSU
- National Register nomination form
- Kent State Truth Tribunal website
- Interview with Alan Canfora and Dr. Roseann Chic Canfora, survivors of the Kent State shootings – Binghamton University Libraries Center for the Study of the 1960s

== Audio ==
- "Sound Montage On Kent State", Morning Edition, NPR, 5/4/2000 (sound montage from NPR)

== Video ==
- Dean Kahler on KSU's May 4 Visitors' Center – short interview with Dean Kahler.
- On 40th Anniversary of Kent State Shootings, Truth Tribunal Seeks Answers – video report by Democracy Now!
- Death at Kent State, Nat Geo Online
