= Acceptable loss (disambiguation) =

Acceptable loss is a military euphemism for casualties or destruction inflicted by the enemy that is considered minor or tolerable.

Acceptable loss(es) may also refer to:

- "Acceptable Loss" (Law & Order: Special Victims Unit), an episode in season 14 of TV series Law & Order: Special Victims Unit
- "Acceptable Loss", an episode in season 5 of TV series Burn Notice
- Acceptable Loss, a 2011 novel by Anne Perry
- Acceptable Losses, a 1982 novel by Irwin Shaw
- Acceptable Losses, a 2008 novel by Norman Weissman
- "Acceptable Losses", a 2006 song by Lisa Miskovsky
- "Acceptable Losses", an episode of TV series E-ring
- "Acceptable Losses", an episode of TV series Tour of Duty
- "Acceptable Losses", an episode of TV series The District
- An Acceptable Loss, a film by Joe Chappelle
