= Minoti Vaishnav =

American songwriter

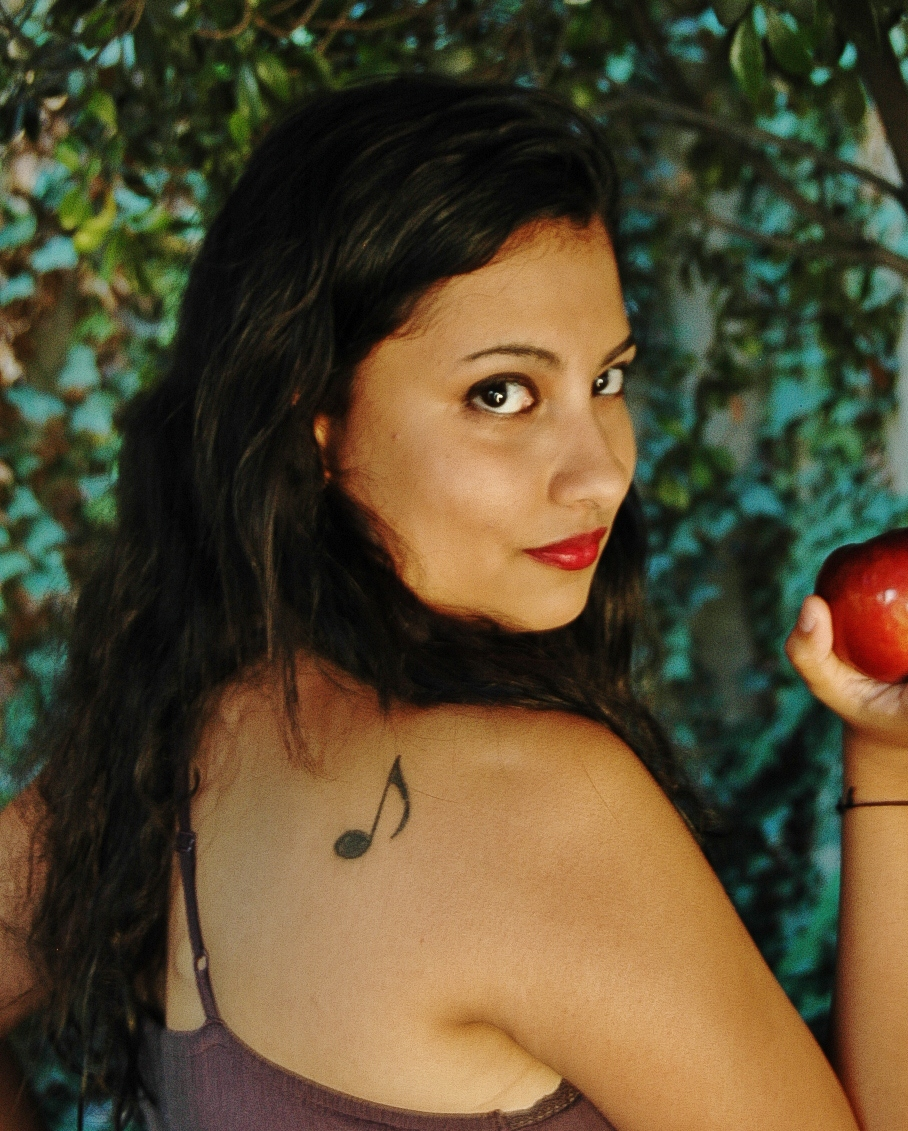
- Born: Bombay, Maharashtra, India
- Years active: 2008–Present

Minoti Vaishnav is an Indian–born American screenwriter, songwriter, and entertainment producer. Born in Mumbai, she moved to Los Angeles at the age of 19, leaving her family back in India. At 22 she produced her first album "The Fictional Truth", with her first single "Psychologist" getting several thousands of downloads online. In 2012 she graduated from California State University Northridge and released her second album "Secret Garden" in 2013. In 2018, she attended University of Oxford where she earned a master's degree in creative writing.

In spite of not being signed to a label, the music video for her single "So Will You" went semi-viral on YouTube with over 100,000 views (a significant number for the time) and her songs have played on radio stations across the U.S., U.K., Canada, Singapore and Denmark. In 2015, she released her third album "Mix It Up".

On the film and television front, Minoti worked for the International Documentary Association and on HBO's Emmy nominated documentary American Winter (2013). She wrote and produced projects such as 3 Orbs of Light (2011) and Being Independent (2015). Minoti has also developed and composed music for Alexis Krasilovsky's Award-winning documentary Let Them Eat Cake (2014), and has worked in production and development at various production companies. In 2020, she was hired as a staff writer on The Equalizer (2021 TV series) starring Queen Latifah. In 2022 and 2023, Minoti was a writer on True Lies (TV series). In 2024 she produced Someone is Killing the Wolfhounds, a limited podcast series for Voyage Media. The series went to #1 on the Apple Fiction Podcast Charts. In 2025, she wrote all 8 episodes of season 1 of The Mind Doctor, a scripted medial procedural series. The series went to #2 on the Apple Drama Podcast Charts. As of 2026, Minoti is developing television, film and podcast projects for various studios and platforms. She also has two short fiction pieces slated for publication in 2026 and early 2027.

== Music career ==
Minoti began writing songs at 11 years old and recorded her first professional demo at age 13. She learned how to play the guitar by ear, and at 16, she bought a keyboard and started taking professional vocal training as well as theory and ear training classes. With much help from her father, she started recording demos at home. Her first unofficial CD included the songs "Keep Track", "Promises" and "This is How I Feel" which were minor hits on Indie Artist website stereofame.com in 2008.

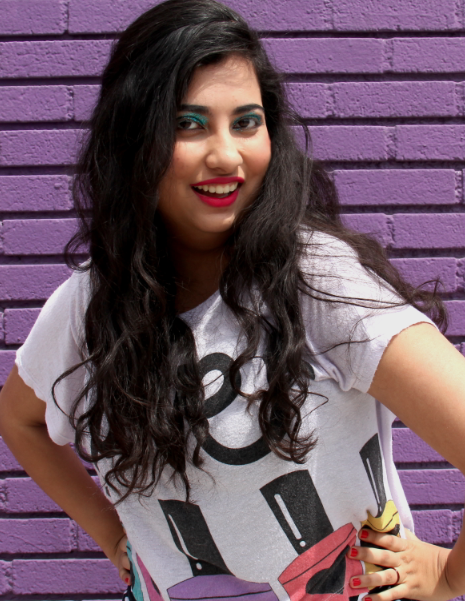
Promo Photo from "Mix It Up"

In 2010, Minoti released her first album, "The Fictional Truth" and dropped her last name as an artist. The album is a raw indie-pop album with mostly live, acoustic songs. The album was released on August 1, 2010. Minoti wrote and composed every single song on the album, with writing help from her cousins Farah Sheth and Vivek Vaishnav on the songs "Coffee" and "Tin Man". Seven out of eight of the songs were recorded in a home studio and were released with virtually no sound tweaking or editing. The only studio-produced track on the album, Psychologist, was an instant hit on Stereofame.com, which was one of the biggest platforms for indie artists at the time.

Minoti crowdfunded her second album on Kickstarter. The album, "Secret Garden", is also raw indie-pop album, but includes a 90's alternative vibe. The album was released on March 4, 2013. Songs from the album – particularly "So Will You", "Nothing Inside" and "Secret Garden" have been played on radio stations all over the world – from the U.K to Singapore. The music video for the first single, "So Will You", received over 100,000 video views in its first few weeks of release. Indie critical reception was favorable. Music blog RippleMusic called "Secret Garden" "as catchy as the ebola virus" and stated that "Minoti's voice is understated and the music moves with a clever coolness". The album entered the Top 10 on Gashouse Radio in the #9 spot, and was featured on KALX Berkeley's "Next Big Thing".

On September 8, 2015, Minoti released "Mix It Up". The album garnered over 100,000 streams, a high number for an unknown indie artist in the pre-Instagram and TikTok world. Minoti left the music world behind for a film & television career soon after the release of this album.

=== Discography ===
Mix It Up

- Released: September 8, 2015
- Tracks: 10

Secret Garden

- Released: March 4, 2013
- Tracks: 10
- Singles: "So Will You"

The Fictional Truth

- Released: August 1, 2010
- Tracks: 8
- Singles: "Psychologist"

== Film and television career ==
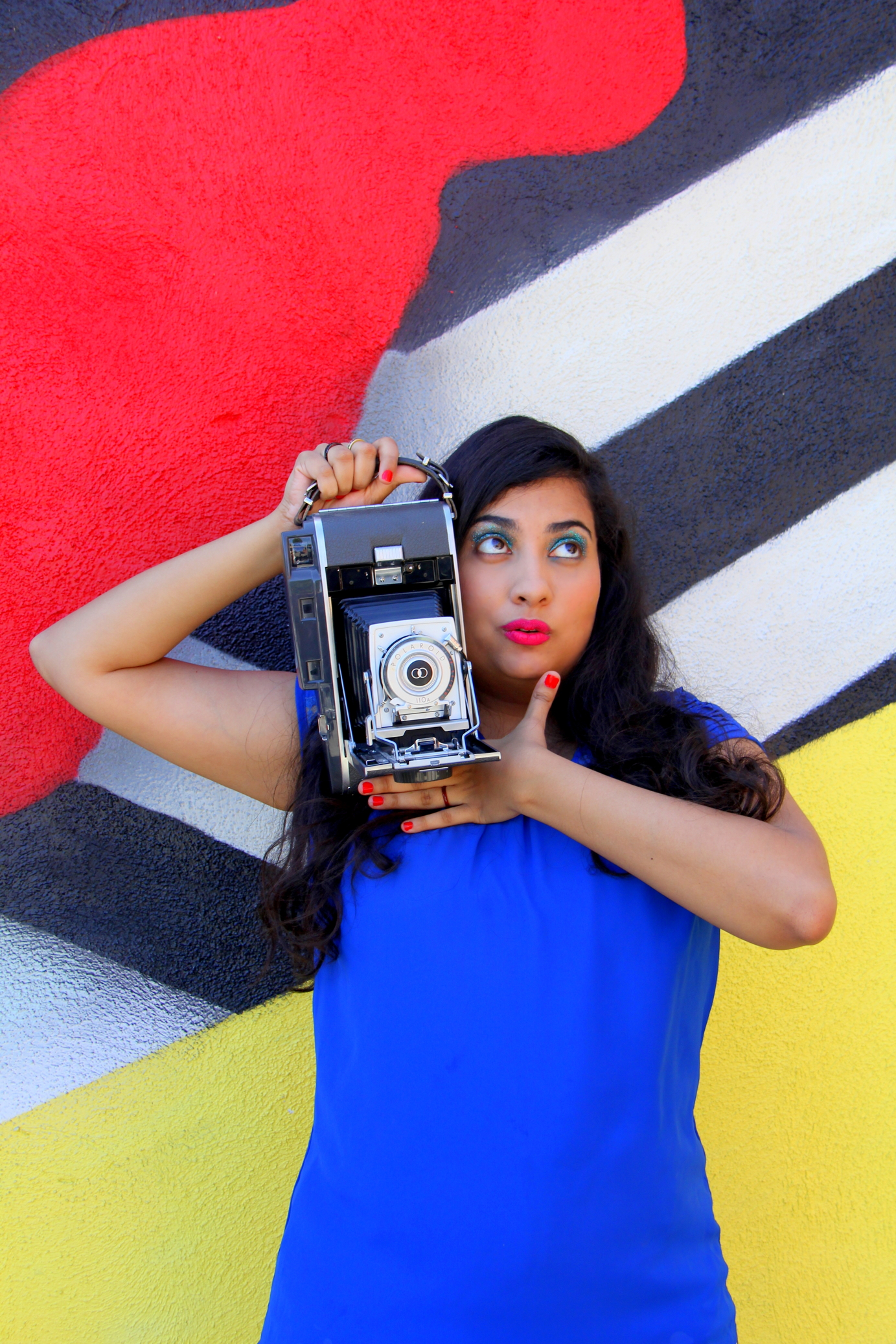
Minoti in a 2015 promo photo

In 2013, Minoti started Prophecy Girl Films, a company that is "a hybrid between a marketing company and a production company". Company services include script development, marketing, social media, public relations and on-site production for film, television, books, and music.

Minoti's television work as a producer includes Hunting Hitler (History Channel), JFK Declassified: Tracking Oswald (History Channel), Legends of the Lost with Megan Fox (Travel Channel), Rise of Empires: Ottoman (Netflix) and many others.

Minoti is a member of the Writers Guild of America West, The Academy of Television Arts & Sciences, Broadcast Music Inc. and the Phi Beta Delta International Honor Society. She is represented by TFC Management.
