= Intra Bank =

Intra Bank SAL
- Type: No longer trading
- Industry: Banking
- Founded: 1951
- Defunct: 1966
- Headquarters: Beirut, Lebanon
- Key people: Yousef Beidas (Chairman and General Manager)

Intra Bank (also known as Banque Intra or بنك انترا) was a Lebanese bank, and the largest financial institution in Lebanon until its collapse in 1966.

== Foundation and rise of the bank ==
The bank was founded in 1951 by Yousef Beidas and three partners as a trading company. The law in Lebanon in 1953 covers banking activities as they are known now and became known in Lebanon during the 1950s and 1960s thanks to a large degree to the efforts of Yousef Beidas who was named as the Architect of Lebanese Banking in the Illustrated London News in October 1963. In that major article entitled "The Changing Face of the Middle East" which ran over a dozen pages and was an introduction to European and North American readers to an area given little attention prior to the meteoric rise in status of oil exporting and petrodollar earning states the coverage on Yousef Beidas was a full two pages whereas, for historical comparison purposes, the then ruler of Dubai, Shaikh Rashed bin Saeed al Maktoum, father of the present ruler Shaikh Mohammad bin Rashed, was allocated a quarter page.

Prior to the establishment of Intra Bank the partners had established International Traders (whose cable address was Intra) as a money changing business, and a general trading company with agencies such as Ford Motor Company, Facit business machines and others. International Traders had become the leading money exchange house of Beirut and most of the successful and wealthy expatriates, Najib Salha (wealthiest man in Lebanon in the 1950s and 1960s who later became a major shareholder in Intra Bank) included, were International Traders forex clients.

Intra Bank started in Lebanon but as the recipient of much of the oil income from the Arabian Peninsula it embarked on an expansion program that saw it opening branches all over the Middle East, Africa, Europe and the Americas. This was not all done in the Intra Bank name, banks in other countries were often local entities such as the Bank of the North in Nigeria, Bano Intra S.A., Brasil Banque Intra S.A. (Suisse) etc.

== Collapse and controversy ==
The bank stopped payments on October 14, 1966. The collapse of the bank brought the Lebanese economy to a halt and sent shockwaves throughout the Middle East. Intra Bank accounted for 15% of total bank deposits and 38% of deposits with Lebanese-owned banks.

Many observers questioned why the Lebanese Central Bank, which was established only two and a half years earlier in April 1964, did not provide liquidity to Intra Bank during the run on the bank. Many press commentators believed that this was due to influence from Lebanese politicians and rivals who were unhappy at the influence and power of Palestinian-born Beidas.

The collapse of Intra Bank brought a swathe of new banking regulations for the Lebanese banking sector, although these were enough to restore faith in the Lebanese banking sector to its pre-Intra levels.

The circumstances which surrounded Intra's fall remain to this day controversial issues. The surprisingly weak support from the Lebanese government and the very public allegations over Charles Helou's role in the affair, claimed by some, that have been attributed to such issues as Beidas' Palestinian origin and envy over Beidas' almost complete control of the Lebanese economy, which many others justify with the states' furthest entitlement of raison d'être.

== Intra Investment Company ==
The collapse was followed by its restructuring, with the Central Bank and the Lebanese government taking major shareholdings. The successor company, officially Intra Investment Company but often still referred to as "Intra," remained a major shareholder in key institutions such as Middle East Airlines, Casino du Liban and Bank Al Mashrek, the remaining banking operations.

By 1985, the Central Bank held 28% of Intra, the Kuwaiti government held 19%, the Lebanese held 10%, the National Bank of Kuwait held 4% and the government of Qatar 3%. Today, the Lebanese government's stake is expected to be privatised in due course.

== See also ==
- Yousef Beidas
- Roger Tamraz
