= Robert Baer =

American CIA case officer and author (born 1952)

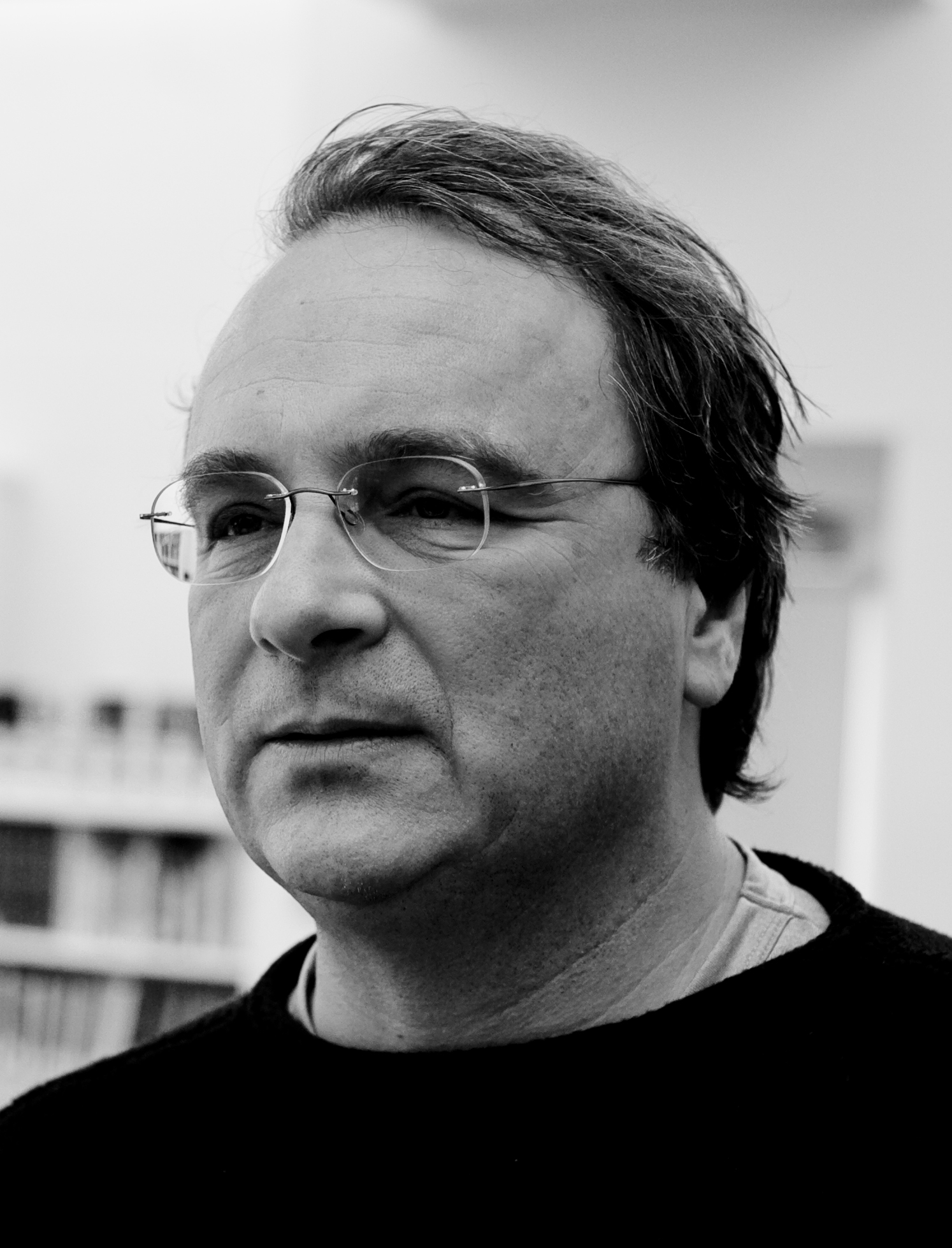
- Baer in 2008
- Born: Robert Booker Baer; July 11, 1952 (age 74); Los Angeles, California, U.S.
- Education: Georgetown University; University of California, Berkeley
- Occupations: Intelligence officer; Author; Political commentator
- Spouse: Dayna Williamson
- Children: 3
- Espionage activity
- Allegiance: US
- Service branch: Central Intelligence Agency
- Service years: 1976–97

Robert Booker Baer (born July 11, 1952) is an American author and a former CIA case officer who was primarily assigned to the Middle East. He is Time's intelligence columnist and has contributed to Vanity Fair, The Wall Street Journal, and The Washington Post. Baer speaks eight languages, won the CIA Career Intelligence Medal and is a frequent commentator and author about issues related to international relations, espionage, and U.S. foreign policy. He hosted the History reality television series Hunting Hitler. He is an Intelligence and Security Analyst for CNN. His book See No Evil was adapted by the director Stephen Gaghan and used as the basis for the film Syriana, with George Clooney playing Baer's character.

== Early life ==
Baer was born in Los Angeles. At the age of 9, his parents divorced and he moved to Aspen, Colorado, where he aspired to become a professional skier. After a fairly poor academic performance during his first year at high school, his mother, a wealthy heiress, took him to Europe where they traveled throughout Europe including Paris during the 1968 riots, Germany, Prague during the Warsaw Pact invasion of Czechoslovakia, and the Soviet Union.

== Career ==
Baer worked field assignments, starting in Madras and New Delhi, India; and subsequently in Beirut, Lebanon; Damascus, Syria; Khartoum, Sudan; Paris, France; Dushanbe, Tajikistan; Morocco; the former republic of Yugoslavia, and Salah al-Din in Iraqi Kurdistan during his 21 years with the CIA. During the mid-1990s, Baer was sent to Iraq with the mission of organizing opposition to Iraqi President Saddam Hussein but was recalled and investigated by the FBI for allegedly conspiring to assassinate the Iraqi leader.

Baer wrote the book See No Evil documenting his experiences while working for the Agency. The C.I. Desk: FBI and CIA Counterintelligence As Seen From My Cubicle, by Christopher Lynch (Dog Ear Publishing), describes parts of the contentious CIA pre-publication review process for Baer's first book. In a blurb for See No Evil, Seymour Hersh said Baer "was considered perhaps the best on-the-ground field officer in the Middle East." In the book, Baer offers an analysis of the Middle East through the lens of his experiences as a CIA operative.

In 2004, he told a reporter of the British political weekly New Statesman, regarding the way the CIA deals with terrorism suspects, "If you want a serious interrogation, you send a prisoner to Jordan. If you want them to be tortured, you send them to Syria. If you want someone to disappear – never to see them again – you send them to Egypt."

He retired to Silverton, Colorado.

=== Commentary ===
In January 2002, Baer wrote about the events of the September 11 attacks in The Guardian: "Did bin Laden act alone, through his own al-Qaida network, in launching the attacks? About that I'm far more certain and emphatic: no." He later stated, "For the record, I don't believe that the World Trade Center was brought down by our own explosives, or that a rocket, rather than an airliner, hit the Pentagon. I spent a career in the CIA trying to orchestrate plots, wasn't all that good at it, and certainly couldn't carry off 9/11. Nor could the real pros I had the pleasure to work with."

In 2008, video interviewed 'live' by 'We Are Change.org' in Los Angeles about pre-9/11 intel, Baer exclaimed: "I know the guy that went into his broker in San Diego (on September 10th) and said, 'Cash me out, it's going down tomorrow'...His brother worked at the White House!"

In June 2009, Baer commented on the disputed election of Mahmoud Ahmadinejad as Iranian President and the protests that accompanied it. "For too many years now, the Western media have looked at Iran through the narrow prism of Iran's liberal middle class—an intelligentsia that is addicted to the Internet and American music and is more ready to talk to the Western press, including people with money to buy tickets to Paris or Los Angeles; but do they represent the real Iran?" Following reports of an attempt by Iranian agents to assassinate the ambassador of Saudi Arabia to the United States, Baer told Die Zeit that he doubted that Iran was behind the attempt since there seemed no obvious motive and Iran had been more careful in past collaboration with terrorists.

Baer has long been a supporter of the theory that the PFLP-GC brought down Pan Am Flight 103. Later he began to promote the theory that Iran was behind the bombing. On August 23, 2009, Baer claimed that the CIA had known from the start that the bombing of Pan Am Flight 103 had been orchestrated by Iran, and that a secret dossier proving this was to be presented as evidence in the final appeal by convicted Libyan bomber Abdelbaset al-Megrahi. According to Baer, this suggests that Megrahi's withdrawal of the appeal in return for a release on compassionate grounds was encouraged to prevent this information from being presented in court.

== Personal life ==
Baer has been married twice. He has two daughters and a son from his first marriage, to a State Department secretary. His second marriage was to fellow CIA operative Dayna Williamson.

== Books and media ==
In 2015–2017, Baer has appeared on Hunting Hitler (2015–2017), and JFK Declassified: Tracking Oswald.

Robert Baer has never written or promoted a book with the title "The Secret of the White House", but a fabricated interview with him about promoting this book in Canada has been circulating on the web since 2012. In this fabricated interview the USA was accused of having caused the collapse of Yugoslavia.

== Media ==
=== Books ===
- See No Evil: The True Story of a Ground Soldier in the CIA's War on Terrorism, Crown Publishing Group, January 2002, ISBN 0-609-60987-4.
- Sleeping With the Devil: How Washington Sold Our Soul for Saudi Crude, Crown Publishing Group, July 2003, ISBN 1-4000-5021-9.
- Blow the House Down: A Novel, Crown Publishing Group, 2006, ISBN 1-4000-9835-1.
- The Devil We Know: Dealing with the New Iranian Superpower, Crown Publishing Group, September 2008 ISBN 0-307-40864-7
- The Company We Keep: A Husband-and-Wife True-Life Spy Story, Crown Publishing Group, March 8, 2011
- The Perfect Kill: 21 Laws for Assassins, 2014
- The Fourth Man: The Hunt for a KGB Spy at the Top of the CIA and the Rise of Putin's Russia, Hachette Books, May 2022 ISBN 978-0-306-92560-3

=== Films ===
- The Cult of the Suicide Bomber
- Cult of the Suicide Bomber II
- Cult of the Suicide Bomber III
- Car Bomb
- Syriana

=== Television ===
- Hunting Hitler, History (2015–2018)
- JFK Declassified: Tracking Oswald, History (2017)

== See also ==
- William Francis Buckley
- John P. O'Neill
- Imad Mughniyah
