= Yousef Beidas =

Palestinian businessman (1912–1968)

Yousef Beidas (Arabic: يوسف بيدس, also transliterated Yusif Bedas, Yusef Baydas, Yousif Beydas) (December 1912 – 28 November 1968) was a banker born to a Palestinian father and a Lebanese Beirut-born mother. Known as "The Genius from Jerusalem" and the founder and Chairman of Intra Bank headquartered in Lebanon, he was a central figure in one of the Middle East's financial success stories and later one of its most disastrous financial collapses. Until his final days, Beidas claimed he was victim of "a well-planned conspiracy".

== Early life ==
Born in the Mutasarrifate of Jerusalem under Ottoman rule, Beidas was the son of Palestinian author and scholar Khalil Beidas and a Lebanese mother. In Mandatory Palestine he enjoyed a brilliant and precocious career. He was appointed the director of the exchange section of the Palestinian branch of Barclay's Bank at 21 years of age, and rose to be manager of the Arab Bank by the end of World War 2. Having fled Palestine in 1948 with his pregnant wife, the Lebanese Wedad (Salameh) Abou Fadel, whom he married in 1946, was granted the Lebanese passport on account of his Lebanese Beirut-born mother. One of the outcomes of the Israeli-Arab war in Palestine in 1948, and the concomitant flight of huge numbers of Palestinians, was that Haifa lost its status as the commercial centre of the Mashriq or Arab countries east of Egypt, and the role was picked up by Beirut. Lebanese traders were happy to lay out the red carpet for people they otherwise regarded as "two -bit Palestinians" for the capital and talent that could bring to the local economy.

Beidas set himself up as a money-changer in Beirut with a personal capital of $4,000. On one occasion he even rented all of his office furniture, leaving only a sitting area on the floor for himself to conduct his business, and eventually managed to put 100 competitors out of business.

== Intra Bank ==
Beidas established his Intra (International traders) Bank in 1951, together with three partners, Mounir Abou Fadel, Emile Mousallam and Mounir Haddad, with a capital of 12,000.LL Lebanese pounds, according to one source, or £100,000 sterling based on borrowings from his old clients at the Arab Bank. At the time, Beirut's financial importance was enhanced in the wake of the Tripartite Aggression against Egypt in 1956, which weakened Cairo's function as a beachhead for European investment in the Arab world, the tight bank secrecy rules and absence of exchange controls in the Lebanese banking system made the country a refuge for capital flight, petrodollars and hot money from Arab states of the Persian Gulf. Intra was soon to become the dominant player in the Lebanese economy, and by 1966 it had between 13 and 17 percent of the country's bank deposits and assets which included the Casino du Liban, the largest casino in the world, through which drug money was reportedly recycled, Middle East Airlines and the Port Authority of Beirut. He turned Middle east Airlines, floundering at the time, into one of the most profitable airlines in the world. He owned a steel mill and a mutual fund society. His group also had an extensive repository of real estate holdings in major cities, 40 branches across the globe, prime property investments in a 27-story skyscraper on Fifth Avenue in New York near the Rockefeller Center, Beidas's bank also controlled a shipyard in Marseille, the Londonderry Hotel in Park Lane and a section of the Champs-Élysées. He also opened up a cinema production company "Studio Baalbek" in 1956, hoping to make Lebanon the "Hollywood of the Middle East".

Beidas' rise to a key player in Lebanon's economy aroused business enmities among the country's elites, for whom banking was a traditional and closed family-based monopoly. They resented the fact that a Palestinian interloper had assumed control over central parts of the national infrastructure. Beidas used part of his capital, furthermore, to finance the PLO's Fatah, which was becoming the political and military arm of the Palestinian diaspora. As early as 1962 (16 April) the then President of Lebanon, the Maronite Fuad Chehab, concerned about what he perceived to be the "obscure powers" of international finance extending, though Beidas's companies, their tentacles into the Lebanese economy, sounded out General Pierre Rondot about the possibility of fighting against Beidas's interests in order to weaken his influence. Saudi Arabia's King Faisal in particular was discontented by the radicalism of the cause Beidas supported. Lebanese rumours claimed he was a British agent promoting British over French interests. In the jargon of the streets the Bank's name was spelt backwards to yield artni, a slang expression for "He cheated me". In the early 60s, the Emir of Kuwait, Abdullah Al-Salim Al-Sabah, who was holidaying at the time in the mountain resort of Aley demanded to see the 5 million dollars he had deposited with Intra. Beidas managed to put together the sum, and drove out to the Emir's villa, where he proceeded to slowly count the money out. Before he had finished, the Emir expressed his satisfaction that all was right, but Beidas, outraged by the lack of trust, told him to keep his cash.

== Collapse of Intra Bank ==
At the time Intra bank faced the crisis that led to its bankruptcy, it and the empire Beidas formed around it has a value estimated at between $350 million and $500 million. Beidas told George de Carvalho that on the eve of the crisis, Intra was 60% of all domestically controlled banking.

The collapse of Intra Bank in October 1966 brought the Lebanese economy to a halt and sent shockwaves throughout the Middle East. The circumstances which surrounded Intra's fall remain to this day controversial issues. The surprisingly weak support from the Lebanese government and the very public allegations over Charles Helou's role in the affair have been attributed to such issues as Beidas' Palestinian origin and envy over Beidas' almost complete control of the Lebanese economy.

The bank had incurred losses in gold, copper and American equities. Much of Beidas' Intra Bank money was tied up in non-liquid real estate properties, and, with a sudden jump in Eurobank interest rates on dollar deposits when the US government took measures to curb domestic inflation, a crisis ensued. Furthermore, Beidas had, reportedly, bet all of his available liquid capital against the American dollar. A rush began, on Thursday 13, and Intra paid out $70 million, which by nightfall left only $330,000 in the Bank's coffers. The acting head of the bank, worth personally some $50 million, informed the Lebanese cabinet that he would personally guarantee his bank's balance sheet, but they refused to budge from their position.

Irregularities were later discovered, -- none of them abnormal within Lebanon's banking system—such as loans to directors exceeding what was legally permissible, and dividend payments to Intra companies that were losing money. Beidas had also used funds held in trust to secure personal loans from Chase Manhattan and the Banco di Roma. Checks on Intra documents indicated false account statements, and an understating of liabilities to the tune of $40 million. In addition, Beidas has undercut the local norm advising that 25% of deposits be retained in liquid cash. Intra reduced this margin to 5% in its business practice.

One observer in his recollections states that, nonetheless, the value of Intra's fixed assets, with extensive foreign property abroad, exceeded its financial liabilities. At this critical juncture, Saudi Arabia decided to withdraw its deposits from Beirut, causing a panic and a run on Intra's capital, beginning on 9 October. The Lebanese government, perhaps sensing a unique opportunity to cut Beidas down and strip him off his key infrastructural investments in Lebanon, refused to budge, or consider Beidas request for a $30 million bridging loan to tide Intra over the crisis. Aside from a minor loan mortgaged on the casino, the Port Authority and the Airline. Joseph Oghourlian, deputy governor of Lebanon's central bank, asked him, "Why did you invest in Lebanon? You are not Lebanese, and Lebanon does not want you to control its economy", and turned down his request for a bridging loan down. In Beidas's recollection, Raymond Eddé, president of the Lebanese Bankers Association, had a personal hatred for him, (Note: Betts 1979, p. 132: "As scion of one of the great Maronite Catholic families in Lebanon, Idda was bound to resent the phenomenal success of Baydas, a Palestinian-born Greek Orthodox (with his) English, Protestant education (Saint George's Anglican School, Jerusalem)") shared by the Lebanese Prime Minister, Abdallah El-Yafi, who was annoyed that Beidas had denied him a personal loan, also pressured the Central Bank to turn down his loan request. Chase Manhattan also stepped in by freezing Intra's New York deposits until its own loans to the company were repaid. Though ranked 425th among the world's banks, the subsequent collapse of Intra became, "the world's greatest bank catastrophe since World War 2."

Lebanese bankers stated at the time that the crack was simply due to the fact that Beidas was overextended. Many European bankers and the International Monetary Fund were to disagree, saying that a small loan from Lebanon's Central Bank would have enabled Intra to ride out the crisis without strain. The decision not to intervene was to have drastically averse collateral impact on Lebanon's other banks, as local depositors withdrew their money to open up accounts in US banks. In addition, El-Yafi was forced to resign. Arab trust in the Lebanese banking system vanished, and investors thereafter preferred to place their funds in Zürich, London and New York. The ownership was turned over to the bank's largest depositors and it was to remain the largest financial institution in Lebanon for the following two and a half decades. According to Anthony Sampson many of Beidas' business investments turned out in the long term to be very shrewd.

== Theories about the collapse ==
It was widely believed at the time of the crash that the fall of Beidas and his banking empire was politically inspired. Many conspiracy theories circulate about the basic reasons for the bank's collapse and the destruction of Beida's empire. Some pinpoint its cause on a coalition of Western powers, oil-rich Arab countries, the Israeli Defense establishment, and Lebanese oligarchs. Others cite the Corsican connection, noting that the FBI believed that Marcel Francisci used the gaming tables at the casino to launder profits from drug-running, and attributing a significant role in the unplugging of the Bank to Paul-Louis Weiller, claiming that the financier had connections with the heroin smugglers.

Palestinian reporter and author Said Aburish claims that jealous Lebanese business people, bankers and reporters were behind the demise of the bank. He writes that the rumors that doomed the bank started in the St. George hotel by, among others, a Lebanese whom Beidas refused to appoint to the bank's board and another Lebanese man who owed the bank a big loan. Aburish claims that, when the news of the failure of the bank became known, Lebanese reporters and business people celebrated its failure by drinking champagne in the St. George Hotel.

As to the role of the Kuwaitis in the failure of the bank, Aburish claims that Beidas treated the Emir of Kuwait disrespectfully which made Kuwaitis and other Arab countries in the Persian Gulf area remove their money from the bank. Wilbur Crane Eveland in his book Ropes of Sand claimed that Kuwait caused the failure of the bank in an effort to induce Lebanon to accept more Palestinian refugees: "When Kuwait made huge withdrawals from Lebanon's Intra bank (to induce the country to accept more Palestinian refugees) the bank failed, and the collapse of the Lebanese economy was barely forestalled."

== Aftermath and death ==
Beidas was in Europe trying to raise loans to refloat Intra when the Lebanese government contacted Interpol to have him arrested and extradited. He fled to Brazil with his wife and three children to avoid legal charges, given the precarious legal situation for Palestinians in Lebanon. The following year he was indicted in absentia for fraudulent bankruptcy and the prosecutor asked for a sentence of 7 years hard labour. Though Brazil had no extradition agreements with Lebanon, Lebanese authorities requested a courtesy deportment to make him stand trial. He was placed under house arrest when Lebanese authorities circulated stories that he had financed Brazil's enemies. Beidas faked a heart attack and was recovered in a clinic to sidestep any extradition moves.

Beidas died of pancreatic cancer in Lucerne in 1968, aged 56. He was destitute and nursed by Nabiha, Edward Said's aunt on his father's side, . Rumours circulated that his decease was "mysterious".

Robert Vesco tried but failed to take over what was left of the bank.

Najib Alamuddin wrote in his autobiography The Flying Sheikh:

I am convinced the affair was the beginning of the disintegration of Lebanon and its old type of Lebanese government – a system corrupt in style and morals that had plagued Lebanon since independence and finally plunged the nation into a civil war that threatened its very survival as an independent state.

Edward Said had a slightly different take on the events in his autobiography Out of Place:

Beidas' astounding rise and fall was considered by some to presage the terrible Lebanese-Palestinian disputes of the seventies, but it seemed to me to symbolize the broken trajectory imposed on so many of [the Palestinians] by the events of 1948

== See also ==
- Palestinian Christians

== Sources ==
- Aburish, Said K. (1989). The St George Hotel Bar. Great Britain: Bloomsbury. p. 128. ISBN 978-0-7475-0221-0.
- Alamuddin, Najib (1989). The Flying Sheikh. Quartet Books. ISBN 978-0-7043-0106-1.
- Betts, Robert Brenton (1979). Christians in the Arab East: A Political Study. Society for Promoting Christian Knowledge.
- de Carvalho, George (27 January 1967). "Fall of the "Genius from Jerusalem"". Life Magazine. pp. 87–89.
- Eveland, Wilbur Crane (2018). Ropes of Sand: America's Failure in the Middle East. W. W. Norton. ISBN 978-1-5040-5005-0.
- Harris, William (2012). Lebanon: A History, 600-2011. Oxford University Press. ISBN 978-0-19-998658-3.
- Kumar, Ram Narayan (2012). Martyred But Not Tamed: The Politics of Resistance in the Middle East. SAGE Publications India. ISBN 978-81-321-0960-0.
- Mackey, Sandra (2009). Mirror of the Arab World: Lebanon in Conflict. ISBN 978-0-393-33374-9.
- Malsagne, Stéphane (2011). Fouad Chéhab (1902–1973). Une figure oubliée de l'histoire libanaise [A forgotten figure in Lebanese history] (in French). Beirut: Éditions Karthala and Ifpo. ISBN 978-2-8111-3368-9.
- Mardelli, Bassil A. (2010). Preparing the Mothers of Tomorrow: Education and Islam in Mandate Palestine. iUniverse. ISBN 978-1-4502-1116-1.
- Naylor, R.T. (2004). Hot Money and the Politics of Debt. McGill-Queen's Press. ISBN 978-0-7735-2743-0.
- "Obituary". Time Magazine. 6 December 1968.
- Owen, Roger; Pamuk, Şevket (1998). History of Middle East Economies in the Twentieth Century. I.B.Tauris. ISBN 978-1-86064-276-0.
- Randall, Jonathan C. (2012). Osama: The Making of a Terrorist. I. B. Tauris. ISBN 978-1-78076-055-1.
- Said, Edward (2013). Out of Place: A Memoir. Granta Books. ISBN 978-1-84708-224-4.
- Sampson, Anthony (2013). The Money Lenders. Bloomsbury Publishing. ISBN 978-1-4482-1131-9.
- Scott, Peter Dale (2010). American War Machine: Deep Politics, the CIA Global Drug Connection, and the Road to Afghanistan. Rowman & Littlefield. ISBN 978-1-4422-0589-5.
- Valentine, Douglas (2004). The Strength of the Wolf: The Secret History of America's War on Drugs. Verso. ISBN 978-1-85984-568-4.
