= See No Evil (Baer book) =

Book by Robert Baer

- See No Evil
- Author: Robert Baer
- Language: English
- Subject: Intelligence agency
- Genre: non-fiction
- Publisher: Three Rivers Press
- Publication date: January 7, 2003
- Publication place: United States
- Media type: Paperback
- Pages: 320
- ISBN: 1-4000-4684-X
- OCLC: 51392981
- Dewey Decimal: 327.1273/0092 B 21
- LC Class: JK468.I6 B34 2002c
- Preceded by: Sleeping With the Devil
- Followed by: Blow the House Down

See No Evil: The True Story of a Ground Soldier in the CIA's War Against Terrorism is a 2003 memoir by Robert Baer, a former CIA case officer in the Directorate of Operations. Baer begins with his upbringing in the United States and Europe and continues with a tour of his CIA experiences across the globe. Approximately the first two-thirds of the memoir focus on the various experiences of Baer's two-decade (1976–1997) career at the CIA, while the last third depicts the growing cynicism brought on by the corruption and obliviousness encountered in Washington.

One of the main focal points of the story is Baer's obsession with uncovering the perpetrators of the unsolved 1983 United States Embassy bombing in Beirut, Lebanon. Baer's memoir describes his own solution of the mystery.

The overall theme around which the memoir is built is his view of the CIA losing its prowess due to increasing diplomatic sensitivity in Washington's foreign policies in the aftermath of political fiascoes from active American involvement in foreign politics in the 1970s and 1980s. Baer describes how he believes the CIA steadily degenerated from a potent human-intelligence resource that often saved or spared lives, to a people-shy, satellite-obsessed, and politically oriented branch of a centralized government.

Other topics Baer discusses in the book include: the extent to which the Iranian Revolutionary Guard has been involved in anti-American terrorist activity, most publicly in the 1983 Beirut barracks bombing (a death toll of over 300), but allegedly in a far more diverse range of terrorist operations. Baer also writes about how he believes the CIA failed in forecasting the September 11 attacks on America. Baer's story clearly lays out how the CIA came to the point of not even having a useful agent in the Middle East in the period leading up to the attacks. He goes on to describe the loss of effectiveness of the CIA in the mid-1990s, in the wake of the catastrophic treason of CIA officer Aldrich Ames, and the CIA's failure to identify the mole before lethal damage had been done to many of their operations worldwide.

The final section of the memoir deals with Baer's experience with oil politics in Washington, and the extended reach granted to oil's agenda by the politically fixated and strategically oblivious American government. At one point, Baer is stunned at being asked to approve the sale of a sophisticated American defense weapon to a former Soviet-bloc country as an incentive for participating in an oil deal, while that same country had recently obstructed the investigation of the murder of an American diplomat on their soil. Baer recalls his unwilling association with infamous oil businessman Roger Tamraz and the uneasy realities he extracts from his period of involvement in Washington politics.

The film Syriana (2005) was loosely based on the book.
