= Mazhar Munir =

English actor

- Born: London, England
- Occupation: Actor
- Years active: 2001–present

Mazhar Munir is a television and film actor. Before co-starring in the 2005 movie Syriana, he appeared in three British television shows: The Bill, Mile High and Doctors.

== Life and career ==
Munir was born in London to British Pakistani parents, a carpenter and a seamstress. He began his career by attending weekly drama workshops at the Theatre Royal Stratford East. He was then contacted by Hampstead Theatre in London, who offered them a stage role in Local Boy.

After that, Munir appeared in several TV series before making his film debut in Syriana. Munir was well received in Syriana, where he played Wasim Khan, an unemployed Pakistani immigrant living in the Middle East; the New York Times praised his "delicate, watchful sensitivity".

Munir also earned his marketing degree from Middlesex Business School. He speaks several languages including Urdu, Hindi and Punjabi.

== Filmography ==
Film and Television
Year	Film	Role	Notes
2001	Milagro's Calling	Boy	Short
2003	Doctors	Amit Kumar	episode Solvent
2004	Mile High	Asim	episode Episode #2.7
2004	The Bill	Yusef Khan	episode 235
2005	Syriana	Wasim Khan	
