= Alexis Krasilovsky =

American filmmaker and educator

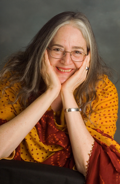
- Born: 1950 (age 75–76)
- Education: California Institute of The Arts (MFA in Film/Video - Experimental Animation 1984) Yale University 1969-71 (B.A. cum laude) University of Florence, Florence, Italy 1968-69 Smith College 1967-69
- Occupations: Filmmaker, writer, professor
- Children: 1
- Website: alexiskrasilovsky.com

Alexis Krasilovsky is an American film producer, director, screenwriter, poet, and activist known for her international collaborations and multi-sensory forms, often portraying societal problems in unexpected or humorous ways. Her work, which spans more than 50 years, includes provocative films, books, documentaries, and video poems. She continues to explore themes of women’s experience, environmental encroachments and concerns, artistic relationships, human rights, (Note: See, for example, Beale Street and Let Them Eat Cake films) more and more on a global scale.

== Early life and education ==
Krasilovsky is the daughter of children's book author Phyllis Krasilovsky and entertainment attorney William Krasilovsky. She grew up in Chappaqua, New York. After studying at Smith College and the University of Florence, she graduated with honors from Yale University and received her MFA in Film/Video from the California Institute of the Arts.

As an undergraduate at Yale in the first class to admit women, one of Krasilovsky’s teachers was film historian Jay Leyda, who taught at Yale 1969-1972.

It was through a Yale course with filmmaker Murray Lerner in conjunction with the Whitney Museum Independent Study Program that she created her first film, End of the Art World.

== Career ==
=== Film ===
End of the Art World is the first film made by a female undergraduate at Yale. It developed during her independent study at the Whitney Museum in New York as Krasilovsky focused on intimate and rarely filmed glimpses into the lives of avant-garde artists under the mentorship of Michael Snow. The film looked at the contemporary (1971) New York art world, featuring interviews with and works by Jo Baer, Jasper Johns, Robert Rauschenberg, Andy Warhol, and others. Krasilovsky used her interviews with the artists themselves to reflect on their art: “With a quality of humor possible only with depth of understanding, Alexis Krasilovsky presents a catalogue of interviews with modern artists in which the shooting style as well as the aural material’s format rehearses the personal style, the aesthetics, and the assumption of each artist about the nature of his art.” –Joan Braderman, Artforum

Kevin Thomas of The Los Angeles Times describes Krasilovsky’s approach: “With ferocious wit, Ms. Krasilovsky sends up New York’s art scene in End of the Art World. "In essence, Ms. Krasilovsky uses the sounds and images of the usual art documentary to create her own work of art. In the process—or reprocess—she satirizes the fatuity of the standard interview with the artist and by the end identifies art with revolution as she fantasizes the quite literal obliteration of the Metropolitan Museum's 20th-century art curator, Henry Geldzahler.”

The Yale Film Archive recently restored and preserved the film through a federally funded grant from the National Film Preservation Foundation, and the new print was featured at a screening in New Haven in March 2024. Krasilovsky noted at the screening that her 1971 film directly addressed the concept of “the end of the art world,” but that in later years, the still male-dominated art world failed to acknowledge that a woman had portrayed – through her art – the very concept in 1971.

She said that she was inspired, as a college student, by Czech filmmaker Vera Chytilova’s film, Daisies, which was shown in New Haven in conjunction with the release of restored End of the Art World. “[I] left the film totally identifying with her [Chytilova’s] vision and feeling like I should be a filmmaker.” She also stated that Chytilova’s sense of resolve had impressed her and that Krasilovsky’s later film, Let Them Eat Cake, drew on this influence.

While End of the Art World broke new ground, it also garnered criticism for presenting “contradictory views on ‘the art world’ that are never fully resolved” while conceding that the film “manages to convey the playfulness of the art of the sixties and early seventies.”

Her experiences at Yale in the first class of women undergraduates sensitized Krasilovsky to the difficulties facing women in the male-dominated world of film. This helped prepare her to persevere in her work and also set a framework for many of her artistic subjects. Feminism and gender disparities are themes woven through much of her work, but she also takes on environmental fragility and consequences of climate change; and several aspects of global inequality. Many of her works have been artistic collaborations, and she has extensively documented the accomplishments of women in the film world.

Blood (1975) is a punk film of middle-class juveniles challenging norms, seeking connections. Krasilovsky was ahead of her time in creating a talking vagina years before Eve Ensler’s The Vagina Monologues opened in 1996. Kevin Thomas of The Los Angeles Times described the film: “In its stream-of-consciousness way 'Blood' (1975), evokes Manhattan street life even more powerfully than Martin Scorsese’s 'Taxi Driver'.'” The essence of the film is about the exploitation of women.

After a screening of her films at the Theatre Vanguard in Los Angeles in 1976, Krasilovsky moved from New York to Los Angeles in the 1970s to pursue filmmaking, writing and directing through her company, Rafael Film.

Krasilovsky's documentary Beale Street (1981; co-directed with Ann Rickey and Walter Baldwin) followed the last march of Martin Luther King Jr. in Memphis, Tennessee. Barbra Streisand has said of Krasilovsky's 1984 documentary Exile, "Such films do more than increase East-West understanding and reduce tensions; they also serve to emphasize that we are all essentially one people, which may be the best hope for our world." The film traces Krasilovsky's family roots back to Prague and Austria and explores the effects of fear, exile, and loss on a family and community.

Exploring new techniques and topics, in the 1980s Krasilovsky incorporated zooming and dissolves for the first time in 360° integral hologram in her film Created and Consumed by Light (1975). She also used holographic images to develop a pro-choice film, Childbirth Dream, “a holography of feelings women have about giving birth.” She noted that her film layered real-life shots with animation, a first. An in-progress version of Childbirth Dream was exhibited in 1987 at the Georges Pompidou Centre in Paris.

Epicenter U. was filmed in 16mm by Krasilovsky and her Cal State Northridge film students following the 1994 Northridge Earthquake. Crafted in makeshift facilities in the aftermath of the 6.7 magnitude disaster that rocked their campus and their homes, the film records not only the devastation of the event but also how young filmmakers' lives were shaken.

Krasilovsky's 2014 film Let Them Eat Cake contrasts the role of pastry from those who overindulge to people in Third World countries who have never consumed a pastry. This documentary feature addresses issues of food production challenges, access to foods, and global inequalities, with footage across many cultures in more than 10 countries. The film underscores undeniable extremes between those with resources and those who go hungry. From portraying exquisite French pastries to starving children, the film’s format is more “poetic essay” than straightforward reporting.

The underlying premise of the film is that the world needs to recognize and deal with the chasm between those who have too much to eat and those who don’t have enough to eat. “I began to think of pastry as the magical amulet that could seduce viewers into examining the stories behind the ingredients ‒ sugar, wheat, rice, corn and chocolate. [Images of] the farmers toiling in sugarcane fields of India and the flooded cornfields of Peru, workers rolling out the dough in a baklava factory in Turkey, children harvesting cocoa in West Africa and rickshaw drivers in Bangladesh who were on the brink of starvation.”

As Zen Buddhist Abbot Shodo Harada Roshi is quoted, "Equal food distribution is fundamental for constructing a society in which there is true peace." The film documents the ingredients, creation of pastries, and the effects that pastry has—including obesity and diabetes—in several countries including Bangladesh, France, India, Japan, Mexico, Peru, Somalia, Turkey and the United States. The film has screened worldwide at several festivals, and includes music from Jenny Eloise Rieu, Ed Finney, Yasumi Miyazawa and Minoti Vaishnav.

=== Videopoetry ===
Since the 1970s, Krasilovsky has been producing videopoems. Like much of her film work, her videopoetry is often intense, challenging norms, advocating for human rights, and focusing attention on societal dysfunction or inequalities. With that directness and a sense of urgency, however, there is often a strain of unexpected humor and interplay of challenging wit, as in recent works, Indigestion and The Celery Saga.

Developed from film footage created in the 1970s when Krasilovsky was working on her Beale Street documentary, her video poem, “What Memphis Needs” (1991), seeks to capture a critical moment in this southern city as it grappled with historical racial tensions and social structures. The genesis of the film's poetry came from Etheridge Knight's Free People's Poetry Workshop, which Krasilovsky attended. Her commentary can reach from gentle to blistering images and draws out the sensory experiences that her media offer. "Her works transcend linguistic and cultural barriers, uniting audiences through the universal language of cinema."

In collaboration with poet Rodger Kamenetz, Krasilovsky created the videopoem, Rafael, based on Kamenetz' poem of the same name. Underscoring the value of voice and of names, the poem's eponym refers to the healing angel Rafael. This also connects to and resonates with Krasilovsky, whose middle name is Rafael and who named her film production company Rafael Film, LLC.

In 2024, the Los Angeles Center for Digital Art featured poetry films by Alexis Krasilovsky as the opening event of the Poetry Film & Video Symposium. Description of her works: "Krasilovsky’s films are notable for their often transgressive visuals and topics, her gifted ability for shifting lyrical interplay between image, sound, and text, and creating a unique sensory experience that evokes both imaginal depth and intellectual reflection."

=== Film and Book Projects: Women Behind the Camera: Conversations with Camerawomen and Shooting Women: Behind the Camera, Around the World ===
Krasilovsky’s feature-length documentary tells the stories of female filmmakers and crew members across 17 countries. When this documentary was released, women made up a tiny percentage of cinematographers of feature films in the US; statistics in other nations were not much better.

The inspiration for Women Behind the Camera came from acquaintance with Brianne Murphy, ASC, whose career in cinematography broke gender barriers, including becoming the first female allowed to join the International Cinematographers Guild.

Krasilovsky praised Brianne, stating, “Brianne was my inspiration because she had the tenacity, the courage and sense of humor that enabled her to survive at a time when the industry was inhospitable to camerawomen.”

Krasilovsky’s interviews with cinematographers and crew members underscore the problems facing women in the field, including perceptions that women needed to stay home with children, that they weren’t capable of handling the heavy equipment, that women shouldn’t be in the vicinity of danger (including war zones) and of general derogatory sexist attitudes encountered from interview through worksite experiences.

The film was preceded by the book, Women Behind the Camera: Conversations with Camerawomen (1997), which focused on American camerawomen, and was followed by a book with an international scope, Shooting Women: Behind the Camera, Around the World, which was authored with Harriet Margolis and Julia Stein. "[Shooting Women] shares insights into what it takes to succeed as a camerawoman… .” Krasilovsky states that the book “tells women what it’s really like, and it encourages women considering this profession by exploring the paths (film school/training programs/mentors/rental houses/on-the-job learning/social activist filming/etc.) towards making a living as a cinematographer.”

Harriet Margolis highlights the value of “identifying general problems that can be solved collectively rather than allowing individual women to feel that they are alone in the world with problems that they can’t solve by themselves.”

=== Writing ===
In addition to poetry books and others about screenwriting and filmmaking, Krasilovsky is the author of several articles that have appeared in Creative Screenwriting. She has also contributed chapters to the books The Search for Reality: The Art of Documentary Filmmaking (ed. Michael Tobias, Michael Wiese Productions, 1998) and Women and Poetry: Tips on Writing, Teaching and Publishing by Successful Women Poets (ed. Carol Smallwood, McFarland, January 2012).

Krasilovsky's 2026 novel, Portrait of an Artist as a Young Woman, has been described as a "#MeToo" story that explores sexual liberation – good and bad –and the struggles of a young artist in the 1960s and 1970s as her creative efforts encounter stultifying traditional values, repressive misogyny, and barriers to creative independence. The book captures a journey to achieve self-autonomy and to continue provocative artistic development.

Krasilovsky is a member of the Writers Guild of America West. She is also a member of the Association of Women Directors, the International Documentary Association and Women in Film.

=== Academics ===
Krasilovsky is Professor Emerita in the Department of Cinema and Television Arts at California State University, Northridge, where she taught film production, screenwriting, media theory and film studies in the Department of Cinema and Television Arts from 1987 to 2022.

== Personal life ==
Alexis Krasilovsky lives in Los Angeles. She continues to make films, write, and promote opportunities for women behind the camera.

== Selected filmography ==
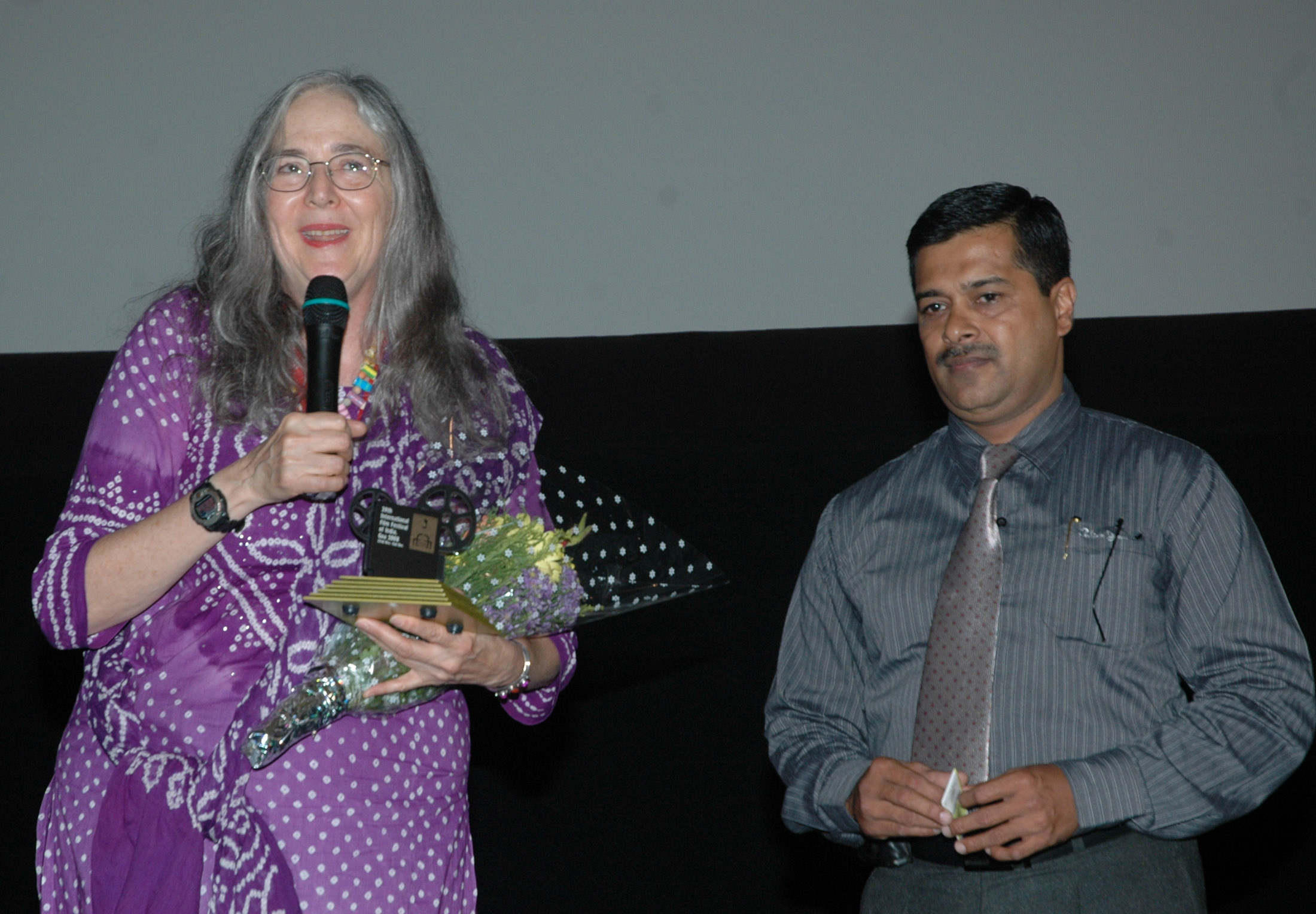
Krasilovsky at the presentation of the film Women Behind the Camera, IFFI (2008)

- Let Them Eat Cake (2014) – writer, producer and director
- Shooting Women (2008) – writer, producer and director
- Some Women Writers Kill Themselves: Selected Videopoems & Poetry of Alexis Krasilovsky (2008) – writer, producer and director
- Women Behind the Camera (2007) – writer, producer and director
- Epicenter U. (1995) – writer, producer and director
- What Memphis Needs (1991) – writer, producer and director
- Exile (1984) – writer, producer and director
- Just Between Me and God (1982) – writer, producer and director
- Beale Street (1978, 1981) – co-directed by Alexis Krasilovsky, Ann Rickey and Walter Baldwin
- Mr. Boogie Woogie (1978) – director
- Blood (1975) – writer, producer and director
- End of the Art World (1971) – writer, producer and director

== Books ==
- Portrait of an Artist as a Young Woman, City Point Press, 2026
- Watermelon Linguistics: New and Selected Poems, Cyberwit.net, 2022
- Great Adaptations: Screenwriting and Global Storytelling, Routledge, New York, London, October 2017
- Shooting Women: Behind the Camera, Around the World, (co-author with Harriet Margolis and Julia Stein) Intellect Books / U. Chicago Press, 2015
- Women Behind the Camera: Conversations with Camerawomen, Praeger: Westport, Connecticut, 1997
- Some Women Writers Kill Themselves and Other Poems, A Street Agency Publication: Los Angeles, 1983, 1985

== Selected videopoems, screenplay and lyrics ==
- Peter Piper Picks on a Pepper, 2025
- The Celery Saga, 2025
- Indigestion, 2025
- The Cyclone Song, 2024 (lyrics) from screenplay "Tuki the Tiger"
- Tuki the Tiger, musical screenplay adaptation of middle-grade novel of the same name by Krasilovsky and Shameem Akhtar.
- Rafael, 2023 based on Rodger Kamenetz' poem of same name, published in his book, The Missing Jew: Poems 1976–2022.
- Positive Thinking, 2023

== Selected awards ==
- Portrait of an Artist as a Young Woman
  - Finalist, Literary Fiction – American Book Fest, 2026
- Peter Piper Picks on a Pepper
  - Best Animated Experimental Award – International Cosmopolitan Film Festival of Tokyo, 2026
  - Independent Spirit Award – Experimental Expo Festival, Los Angeles, 2026
- Indigestion
  - Best Super Short – Hollywood Indie Festival, 2026
  - Best Super Short Film – Portland Moviemakers Awards; Independent Film Awards (Leeds, UK)
  - Best Micro Film – Stockholm Short Film Festival (Stockholm, Sweden)
- The Celery Saga
  - Best Narrative, Experimental Category – Jane Austen International Film Festival, Bath, England, 2026
  - Best Animation – Experimental Film Festival, August 2026
  - Honorable Mention – Art Film Awards, Skopje, North Macedonia, 2026
- Tuki the Tiger (written by Krasilovsky and Shameem Akhtar)
  - Best War Theme Screenplay – Berlin International Screenwriting Festival, 2025
  - Best Animated Screenplay – Oxford Script Awards, 2025
- The Cyclone Song from "Tuki the Tiger"
  - Best Music Video – Asian Talent International Film Festival; Lion King International Film Festival (New York City); Dreamz Catcher International Film Festival (Kolkata)
  - Award of Merit in Music Video category – Nature Without Borders International Film Festival, 2025
- The Techno-Ragers
  - Photography Winner (2nd place) – The Artists Forum, New York, 2024
- Rafael
  - Best One-Minute Film – Luis Buñuel Memorial Awards, Kolkata, India, 2023
  - Best 1-Minute Film – World Film Carnival, Singapore, 2023
- Positive Thinking
  - Best 1-Minute Film – Filmzen International Competition, Paris, France, 2023
  - Best One Minute Film – Cult Jury Film Festival, Gurgaon, India
  - Free Speech Award – Gangtok International Film Festival, Noah, Sikkim, 2023
- Watermelon Linguistics
  - International Book Awards Finalist (Poetry-General category), 2022
- Special Festival Award "Gate of Freedom" statuette – Gdansk DocFilm Festival, Gdansk, Poland, 2011
- Let Them Eat Cake
  - Best Documentary Feature Award – Paris Independent Film Festival, Paris, France, 2015
- Shooting Women
  - Tribute Award, San Francisco Women's Film Festival, 2008
  - Best Women in Cinema Award – San Francisco Women's Film Festival, 2008
  - Best International Documentary – WOW [Women of the World] Film Festival, Sydney, Australia 2008
- Some Women Writers Kill Themselves: Selected Videopoems & Poetry of Alexis Krasilovsky
  - Best of Fest Literary Award, Austin Woman's Music, Film & Literary Festival 2008
- Women Behind the Camera
  - Best of Fest – Documentary Film, Women's Image Network (WIN) Awards, American Film Institute 2009
  - Best Long Form Documentary, BEA (Broadcast Educators’ Association) Media Festival (Las Vegas, Nevada) 2008
  - Best Documentary Feature Award, Female Eye Film Festival (Toronto, Canada) 2008
  - Accolade Competition Award of Excellence: Contemporary Issues/Awareness-Raising 2007
  - Insight Award for Excellence: Documentary Editing 2007
  - Spirit of Moondance Award for Best Documentary Feature (Hollywood) 2007
