= Yale Film Archive =

Film archive at Yale University

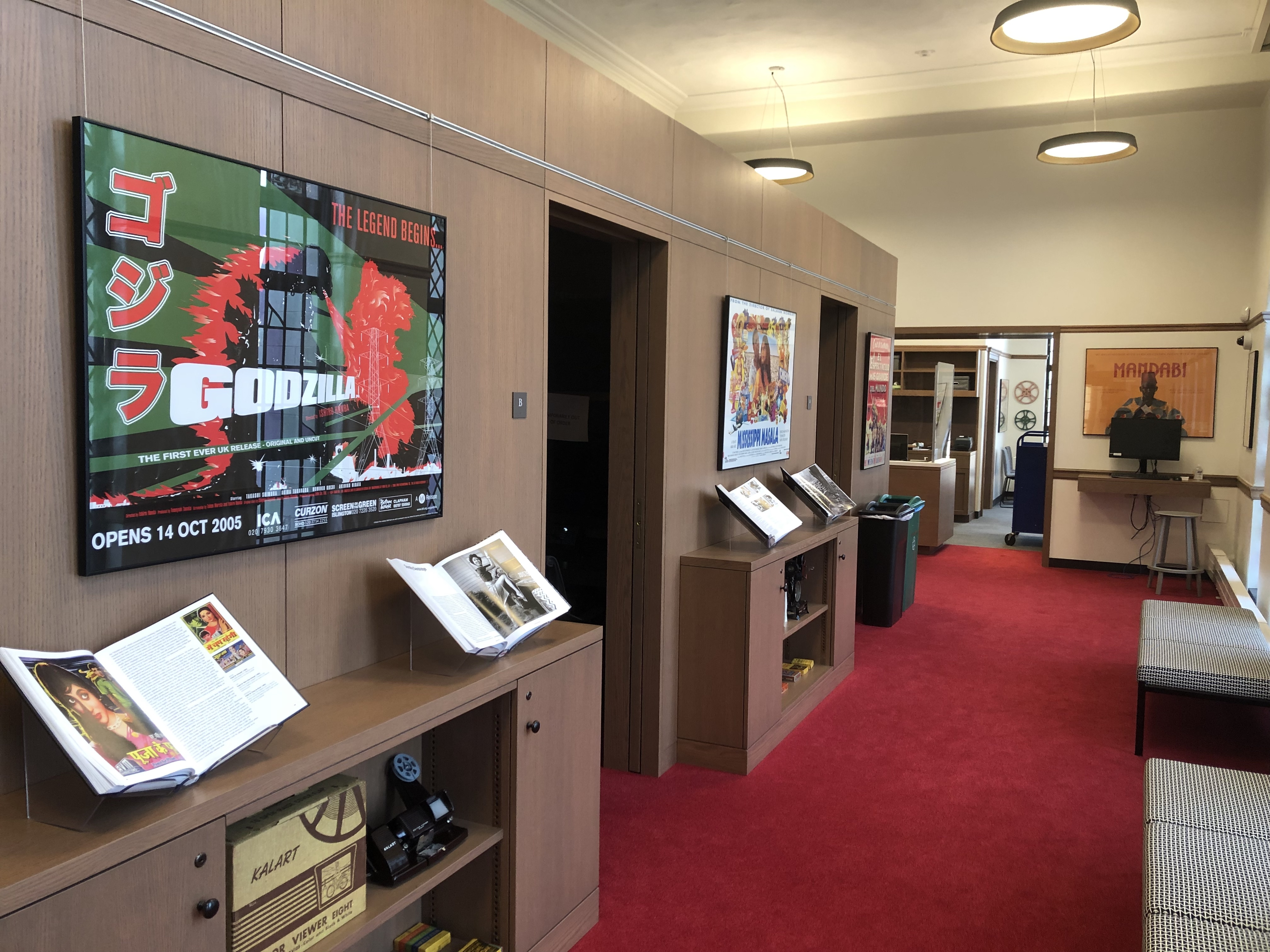
The Yale Film Archive

The Yale Film Archive is a film archive located in Sterling Memorial Library at Yale University, and is part of the Yale University Library. The film collection consists of more than 7,000 35mm, 16mm, 8mm, and Super 8mm prints and the video collection includes more than 50,000 items on DVD, Blu-ray, LaserDisc, and VHS. The Film Archive engages in the conservation, preservation, presentation, and circulation of moving image materials. The Yale Film Archive is a Member of the International Federation of Film Archives.

Founded in 1982 as the Yale Film Study Center, the Yale Film Archive traces its roots to film collections at Yale dating back to the 1960s, including the historic archives of a number of prominent film collectors. The Film Archive is currently involved in efforts to preserve film on film and to share its collection through public screenings, to ensure that films can continue to be presented as they were originally seen by audiences.

The film collection of the Yale Film Archive is made up of a wide range of holdings, from Hollywood features to experimental shorts, from home movies to Bollywood musicals. The collection spans more than 120 years of cinema history, and includes films from around the globe as well as a number of films made by Yale alumni and about Yale and New Haven.

Researchers can view films on site in the Yale Film Archive's screening room, capable of showing 16mm film, DCP, and multiple consumer video formats including 3-D Blu-ray. The Film Archive also has two flatbed film viewing stations and ten private video viewing booths for individual use. The Yale Film Archive regularly screens its 35mm prints for the public in the Whitney Humanities Center Auditorium, the last 35mm-equipped public venue in New Haven County.

Yale Film Archive staff regularly consult on special film projects around the University, including the preservation of film material in the Benny Goodman Collection in the Irving Gilmore Music Library of the Yale University Library.

== History ==
In 1968, Yale began collecting 16mm film with the purchase of several hundred prints known as the John Griggs Collection of Classic Films. The Griggs films came to Yale largely through the efforts of experimental filmmaker Standish Lawder, then Assistant Professor in Yale’s History of Art Department, and Yale alumnus Spencer Berger, a film collector and historian of the Barrymore family. The purchase was funded by three alumni: Fred W. Beinecke, Richard E. Fuller, and Chester J. LaRoche Jr., all graduates of the University. Although modest, this acquisition encouraged other collectors to donate their films, which then became part a vital part of film curricula.

Over the next 15 years, film as an academic discipline grew immensely, leading to the formation of both the Film Studies Program and the Yale Film Study Center in 1982. During the 1980s, the 16mm archive burgeoned with film donations by Yale alumni Spencer Berger, Ralph Hirshorn, and others, while Yale’s 35mm archive was born with hundreds of rare prints of television programs produced by Herbert Brodkin, and collections such as those of the pioneering experimental director Mary Ellen Bute, a 1926 alumna of the Yale School of Drama.

In 2014, the monthly screening series "Treasures from the Yale Film Archive," showcasing 35mm prints from the archive's collection, began. The screenings feature introductions by Film Archive staff as well as Yale faculty, and have also included guest filmmakers such as Lee Isaac Chung, Tamar Simon Hoffs, Warrington Hudlin, James Ivory, Frank and Caroline Mouris, Michael Roemer, Willie Ruff, Ira Sachs, and Norman Weissman, as well as musical accompaniment for silent films by Donald Sosin.

In July, 2017, the Yale Film Archive formally became part of the Yale University Library. In January, 2021, the Film Archive moved to a newly renovated 3,200 square foot headquarters, designed by Apicella + Bunton Architects, in Sterling Memorial Library.

== Preservation ==
Films preserved by the Yale Film Archive include Passages from James Joyce's Finnegans Wake (directed by Mary Ellen Bute) and The Boy Who Saw Through (produced by Bute and directed by George C. Stoney); Our Union, directed by Carl Marzani; To Be a Man, directed by Murray Lerner; and four films by animator Frank Mouris: Quick Dream, You're Not Real Pretty But You're Mine..., Chemical Architecture, and Coney Island Eats. In 2018, the Film Archive completed preservation of director Nicholas Doob's 1979 film "Street Music," which features performances by 19 street musicians including "Oliver "Pork Chop" Anderson," Brother Blue, Bongo Joe Coleman, Jimmy Davis, Guy Mosley, Gene Palma, and "The Automatic Human Jukebox."

The Yale Film Archive also preserved 2-inch videotapes containing a 1972 broadcast by WTIC of "What's Happening," a local news program that covered the visit to Yale by Duke Ellington and other jazz musicians including Eubie Blake, Dizzy Gillespie, Jo Jones, Charles Mingus, Max Roach, and Mary Lou Williams. In 2021, the archive completed preservation work on Sedat Pakay's 1973 short film James Baldwin: From Another Place, which captures James Baldwin during his time living in Istanbul, Turkey in 1970.

In 2022, thanks to a grant from The Film Foundation, the Yale Film Archive restored Losing Ground in 4K using the original 16mm negative to create a new 35mm negative, 35mm prints, and DCPs.

== Collections ==
The Yale Film Archive holds a number of individual collections of the films of various filmmakers and film collectors, some of which are listed below.

- Ashish Avikunthak, filmmaker
- Steve Benson, poet and filmmaker
- Spencer Berger, film collector
- Mary Ellen Bute, animator
- Phyllis Chillingworth, painter, filmmaker
- Kathleen Collins, filmmaker
- Victor Cromwell, former CBS cameraman
- Nicholas Doob, documentary filmmaker
- Herb Graff, film collector
- John Griggs, actor and film collector
- Warrington Hudlin, filmmaker
- Alexis Krasilovsky, filmmaker, writer, professor
- Carl Marzani, activist and publisher
- Jordan Mechner, filmmaker and video game designer
- Josh Morton, filmmaker
- Frank Mouris, Academy Award-winning animator
- Sedat Pakay, photographer and filmmaker
- Leopold Pospisil, anthropologist and filmmaker
- Paul Preuss, writer and filmmaker
- Willie Ruff, musician and filmmaker
- Norman Weissman, filmmaker and author
- Robert Withers, filmmaker
