= Sleeping with the Devil =

2004 nonfiction book by Robert Baer

Sleeping with the Devil: How Washington Sold Our Soul for Saudi Crude
- Author: Robert Baer
- Language: English
- Subject: International relations
- Genre: Nonfiction
- Publisher: Three Rivers Press
- Publication date: 2004
- Publication place: United States
- ISBN: 1-4000-5268-8

Sleeping With the Devil: How Washington Sold Our Soul for Saudi Crude is a critique written by former Central Intelligence Agency officer Robert Baer regarding the relationship that exists between the United States and Saudi Arabia. Baer asserts that the U.S.'s political relationship with the House of Saud is not only hypocritical of American values, but also forms an unstable foundation for the safety of the U.S. economy.
