= JFK Declassified: Tracking Oswald =

2017 American TV series

- Genre: True crime
- Directed by: Henry Reed
- Country of origin: United States
- Original language: English
- No. of seasons: 1
- No. of episodes: 7

Production
- Executive producers: Tracy Bacal and Robert Baer
- Running time: 43 minutes

Original release
- Network: History Channel
- Release: April 25, 2017

JFK Declassified: Tracking Oswald is a History Channel television series about an investigation led by former CIA agent Robert Baer and former LAPD police lieutenant Adam Bercovici into the 1963 assassination of U.S. president John F. Kennedy, using recently declassified government documents to track down locations and witnesses connected with assassin Lee Harvey Oswald.

== Episodes ==
=== Season 1 (2017) ===
No. overall	No. in season	Title	Original release date
1	1	"The Iron Meeting"	April 25, 2017
Former CIA agent Bob Baer launches a global investigation into assassin Lee Harvey Oswald and the murder of President John F. Kennedy. A declassified CIA document reveals that Oswald met with Soviet officials in Mexico City only six weeks before the assassination.
2	2	"The Russian Network"	May 2, 2017
A former KGB officer is interviewed and claims Oswald came to the Soviet Embassy in Mexico City requesting to return to Belarus. Oswald seemed emotionally unstable and drew a pistol during the interview, ending the meeting and resulting in his expulsion from the embassy.
3	3	"Oswald Goes Dark"	September 16, 2017
Oswald tries to obtain a visa to go to Cuba from the Cuban Embassy in Mexico City, but is alleged to have become upset when told he would have to supply visa photos, and he was thrown out. The Mexican receptionist who interviewed him at the embassy told Mexican police that was the only time she had ever seen Oswald, but a witness places Oswald, the receptionist and the Cuban consul at the same dance party for Mexican leftists, and says he heard Oswald was invited by the receptionist. Oswald returns to New Orleans and finds a job at a coffee company located near a garage which is said to have also served as a federal motor pool for undercover vehicles, where he is sometimes found hanging out by his employer during work hours. Oswald offers his military skills to an anti-Castro Cuban exile group in New Orleans but is rebuffed. He is later arrested after a fight breaks out while he is passing out "Fair Play for Cuba" pamphlets defending the Castro regime. An abandoned, secret military depot, likely connected with the CIA's JMMOVE program to arm Cuban exile groups, is discovered 15 minutes from where Oswald was living in New Orleans.
4	4	"The Cuban Connection"	September 16, 2017
Oswald disappears for a month, possibly training with Cuban exile groups in a Louisiana swamp as part of the CIA's JMWAVE program to prepare Cuban exiles for another attempted invasion of Cuba. Oswald may have made contact with members of the Alpha 66 group, who possibly "went rogue" and were involved in the Kennedy assassination.
5	5	"Scene of the Crime"	September 16, 2017
Investigators dismiss "second shooter" theories after a ballistic test shows slight backward movement of a dummy's head when shot from the above rear, and acoustic modeling that shows witnesses may have heard an echo of Oswald's shots instead of shots from a second shooter on the "grassy knoll".
6	6	"The Truth"	September 16, 2017
After shooting Kennedy, Oswald inexplicably returns to his Dallas boarding house to get his pistol. He may have been trying to catch a bus, using a transfer ticket later found in his pocket, when he encountered and shot Officer J. D. Tippit. The bus would have taken him just blocks from an alleged safehouse where Cuban exiles were known to live. A former Cuban intelligence officer tells investigators that Castro was apparently aware of the JFK assassination in advance, due to infiltration of exile groups by Cuban government spies.
7	7	"The New Files"	December 19, 2017
On 26 October 2017, an additional 2,891 secret files concerning the JFK assassination were declassified and released by the United States Federal Government. Robert Baer and his team then examined these new files and presented his findings and updated conclusions in this episode.

In most countries, episodes 1-6 aired between April 25 and May 30, 2017. But, in the USA, episodes 3-6 were delayed until 16 September 2017. Then, after the additional 2,891 secret files came to light on 26 October 2017, Baer and his team examined them and presented updated findings in a follow-up episode - the seventh one - on 19 December 2017.
