= Casino du Liban =

Casino in Maameltein near Beirut, Lebanon

Coordinates: 34.014976°N 35.640513°E

- كازينو لبنان (Arabic)

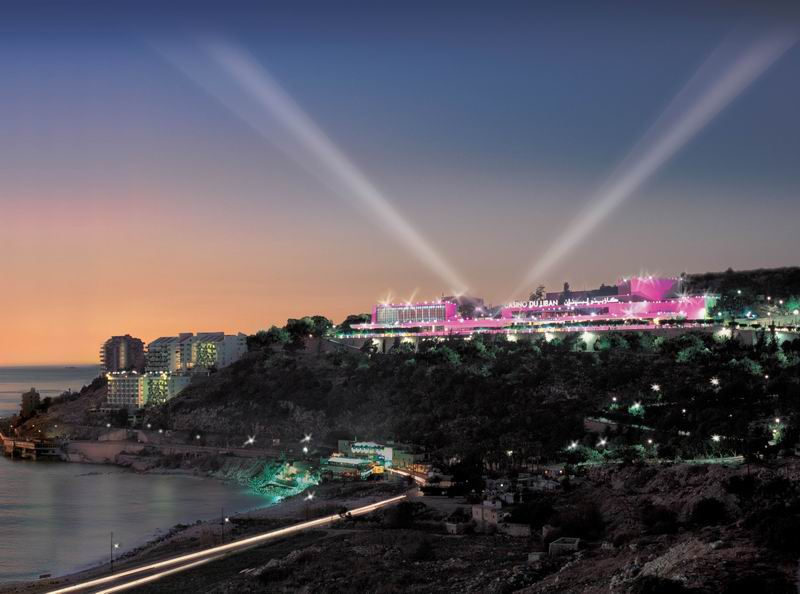
- Casino du Liban at night
- Interactive map of Casino du Liban
- Location: Jounieh, Ghazir
- Notable restaurants: La Martingale
- Website: cdl.com.lb

Casino du Liban (lit. 'Casino of Lebanon' or 'Lebanon Casino'; Arabic: كازينو لبنان) is a casino located in Jounieh, Lebanon, 22 km north of Beirut. The casino is managed by Metropolitan Gaming, a subsidiary of Silver Point Capital.

== Overview ==
With an area of about 35,000 square meters, the casino has around 400 slot machines and 60 gaming tables. It has a showroom, nightclub, theater, banquet facility and five restaurants. The casino was first opened in 1959. It closed in 1989 during the Lebanese Civil War and reopened in 1996 after a $50 million reconstruction and refurbishment project.

Performers at the Casino's night club included Duke Ellington, Danny Thomas, Jacques Brel, Julio Iglesias, and Zade Dirani. Visitors at the casino included King Hussein of Jordan, Albert II, Prince of Monaco, the Shah of Iran, Aristotle Onassis, Omar Sharif,

In his memoir of the international hotel business, Shadow of the Sun: Travels And Adventures in the World of Hotels, Peter J. Venison wrote that the Casino du Liban "was elegant, yet the cabaret was spectacular and rivaled anything that Las Vegas could offer". He also described it as a backdrop of a James Bond novel where clientele from the richest elite of European and Arabian societies ventured into the casino in formal black-tie attire.

The Casino du Liban is majority-owned by Intra Investment Company, a Lebanese government-controlled company which is the remainder of the former Intra Bank, with the remainder of the shares held by private companies and individuals. The casino is managed by London Clubs International, a subsidiary of Caesars Entertainment.

== In literature ==
- Captain from Corfu by Muriel Maddox

"A tour of the city was planned and that evening dinner at the Casino du Liban."

- The Man in the Middle by Hugh Atkinson

"The Casino du Liban was set on a cliff, outside Beirut on the coast road."

- Danger and Opportunity: An American Ambassador's Journey Through the Middle East by Edward Djerejian, former United States Ambassador to Syria and Israel

"One of my early impressions of the contrasts of life in Lebanon was my first visit to the Casino du Liban—a luxurious gambling and entertainment spot in maamlten on the Mediterranean coast north of Beirut."

== In popular culture ==
- A scene in the 1965 film 24 Hours to Kill takes place in the Casino du Liban and features Charley Henchis' Ballet of Casino du Liban.
