= Norman Weissman =

American film director (1925–2021)

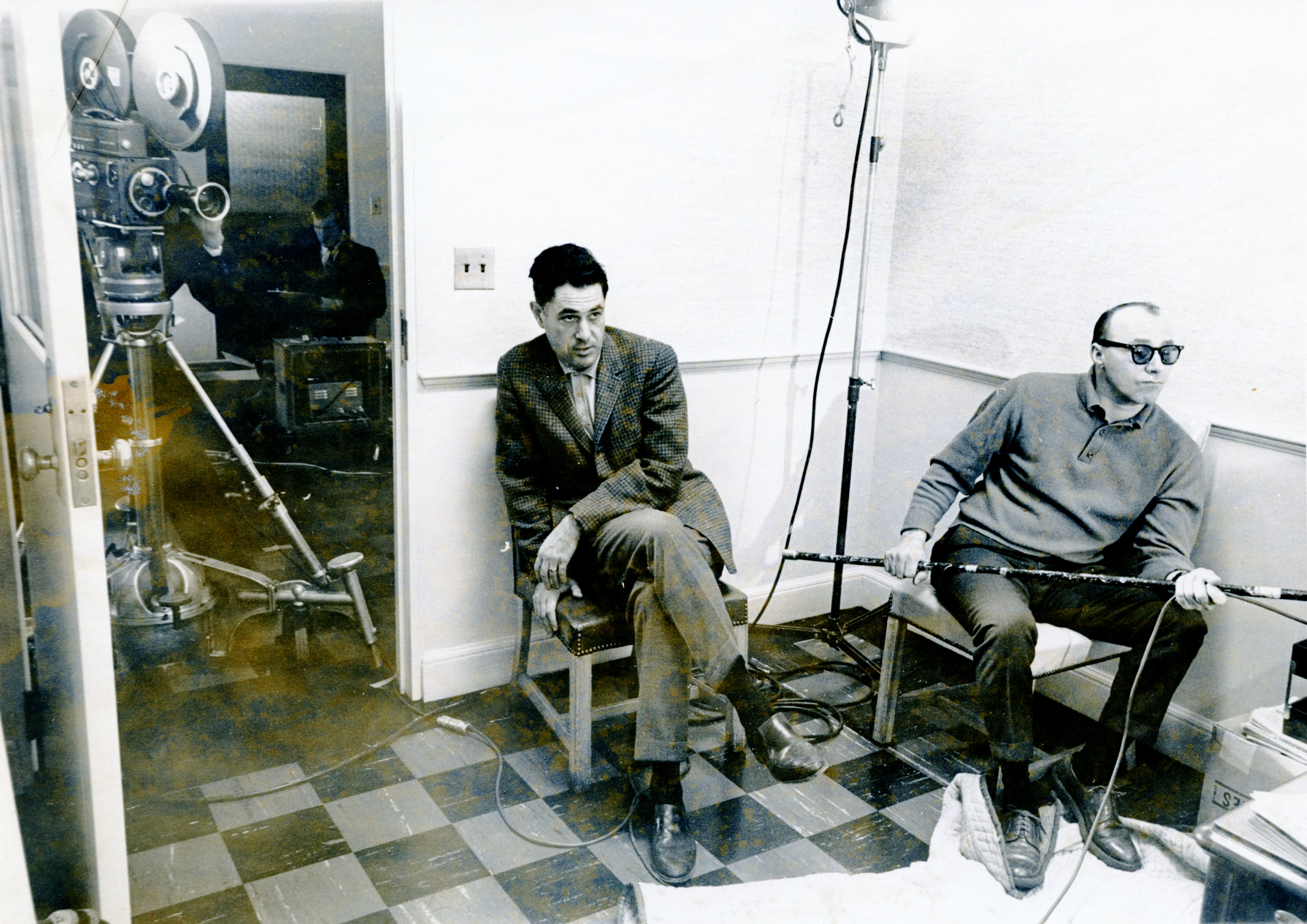
Weissman directing

Norman Weissman (12 April 1925 – 27 May 2021) was an American writer, director, and producer of motion pictures and television shows. He was a graduate of Dartmouth College.

== Motion picture and television career ==
Weissman was employed in motion pictures and television, writing, directing and producing more than four hundred TV series programs, television specials, documentaries and theatrical productions. He has had extensive experience with network and syndicated shows, including Fireside Theater, Four Star Playhouse, Armstrong Circle Theater, and the Lloyd Bridges TV series.

== Early credits ==
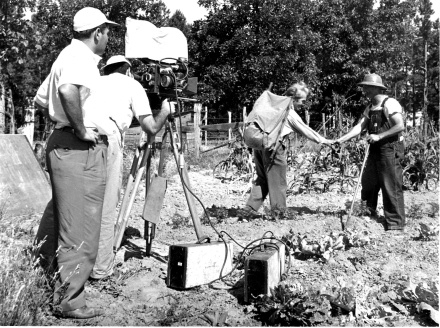
Sy (Seymour) and Norman Weissman during filming of Wilderness Library for the USIA

Weissman's early credits include writing network radio and TV shows such as:

- The Shadow
- The Private Files of Matthew Bell with Joseph Cotten
- Cafe Istanbul with Marlene Dietrich, and Studio One

A trilogy for the United States Information Agency in 1951 was well received when shown to overseas audiences:

- Wilderness Library
- School of the Ozarks
- Ozark Newspaperwoman

He wrote the American Profiles TV series distributed by BBC and the USIA, and the CBS TV Eye on the World Pilot program with Walter Cronkite.

== Theatrical credits ==
His theatrical credits include writing and editing Scuba with Lloyd Bridges, an Avco-Embassy-CineFilm release; writing and production managing Pepi Columbus with Joseph Meinrad, produced by Ernest Heusermann of the Stadt Theater, Vienna; and writing and directing film segments for the CBS Will Rogers, Jr. TV morning show.

== TV specials ==
Weissman wrote and directed the following TV specials:

- Ninety Days to Nowhere
- Task Force 77
- A Man Called Skipper
- Muhammad Ali Victorious
- Men For All Seasons
- A Single Step
- Invisible World Beneath our Seas
- The Best Is Yet To Come
- Taming of A virus
- The Next Step
- The Silent Killer
- The Education of John Weems
- The Hunters

== Awards ==
Norman Weissman has won numerous film festival awards including three American Film Festivals, a CHRIS Award and one Academy Award nomination. He was a member of the Directors Guild of America.

== Books ==
Norman Weissman has also authored eight books.

- "Snapshots USA" (2008) Hammonasset House Books, Mystic CT.
- "Acceptable Losses" (2008) Hammonasset House Books, Mystic CT.
- "My Exuberant Voyage" (2009) Hammonasset House Books, Mystic CT.
- "Oh Palestine" (2014) Hammonasset House Books, Mystic CT
- "The Prodigy" (2015) Hammonasset House Books, Mystic CT
- "The Patriot" (2018) Hammonasset House Books, Mystic CT
- "Prospect Park Stories" (2019) Hammonasset House Books, Mystic CT
- "Requiem for Warriors" (2020) Hammonasset House Books, Mystic CT

== Archives and collections ==
Norman Weissman's books and papers are archived at the Yale Collection of American Literature at the Beinecke Rare Book & Manuscript Library. Twelve of his documentary shorts are in the collection of the Yale Film Archive.

== Time at Dartmouth ==
While studying at Dartmouth College, Norman was a student of Robert Frost and Eugen Rosenstock-Huessy. He has contributed to conferences held by the ERH Society of North America.

== Wartime Service ==
During World War II Norman served as an Aviator in the United States Navy in the Atlantic Theater. He flew Grumman F6F Hellcat and Douglas SBD Dauntless aircraft.

== Personal life ==
In 1948 Norman married Mojave Millier, daughter of artist and art-critic Arthur Millier. Norman and Mojave together had four children, and later divorced. In 1972 he remarried Eveline Weissman with whom he was married until his death in 2021. Norman and Eveline had two children.
