= Deaths in November 1978 =

The following is a list of notable deaths in November 1978. Entries for each day are listed alphabetically by surname. A typical entry lists information in the following sequence:

- Name, age, country of citizenship at birth, subsequent country of citizenship (if applicable), reason for notability, cause of death (if known), and reference.

== November 1978 ==
=== 2 ===
- Henry Willson, 67, American talent agent for Hollywood, he played a large role in developing the beefcake craze of the 1950s, in his later years, Willson struggled with drug addiction, alcoholism, paranoia, and weight problems, as his own homosexuality had become public knowledge, many of his clients, both gay and straight, distanced themselves from him for fear of being branded the same, death from cirrhosis of the liver.

=== 4 ===
- Mary Benedict Cushing, 72, American socialite, philanthropist and art collector, she was one of the three prominent Cushing sisters,she and her second husband James Whitney Fosburgh amassed a significant art collection known for its paintings, including works by Paul Cézanne, Winslow Homer, William Nicholson, Pierre-Auguste Renoir, Walter Sickert, and Pavel Tchelitchew.

=== 5 ===
- Denis O'Dea, 73, Irish actor, he was a leading member of Dublin's Abbey Theatre, where he had a great acting career from 1929 until 1953, his theatrical work led to a number of notable film roles, including two mid-1930s John Ford films, The Informer (1935) and The Plough and the Stars (1936), and the part of the police inspector in pursuit of an Irish Republican Army member in Carol Reed's Odd Man Out (1947).

=== 6 ===
- Flora Campbell, 67, American actress, on television, Campbell played Karen St. John in Faraway Hill, Helen Emerson on Woman with a Past, Dr. Robin McKay in The Seeking Heart, Dora Foster in A Date with Judy and Helen Emerson on Valiant Lady.

=== 7 ===
- Gene Tunney, 81, American professional boxer, he was the world heavyweight boxing champion from 1926 until 1928, he was previously the boxing champion of the American Expeditionary Forces champion, but he chose to spend the winter of 1921 as a lumberjack in Northern Ontario, without revealing to his employers that he was a champion boxer; he later explained that he used the solitude and the strenuous labors of the job as conditioning for his boxing career, death caused by an unspecified disorder of the circulatory system.

=== 8 ===
- Norman Rockwell, 84, American painter and illustrator, he is most famous for the cover illustrations of everyday life which he created for The Saturday Evening Post magazine over nearly five decades, death from emphysema, caused by his lifestyle as a heavy smoker.

=== 9 ===
- Neil Nephew, 39, American actor, writer, and story editor, he committed suicide by jumping from the window of his ninth-floor Manhattan apartment. Nephew was reportedly suffering from schizophrenia.

=== 10 ===
- Christine Olson, 86, American businesswoman and politician, in 1924, she won election to the South Dakota House of Representatives as one of 7 members from the 10th district, she served one term there, telling the Argus Leader in December 1925 that she did not intend to run for re-election, in 1931, the American Legion Auxiliary announced that Olson had been chosen as the chairperson for the group's northwestern division, which oversaw the U.S. states of Colorado, Minnesota, Montana, Nebraska, North Dakota, South Dakota, and Wyoming.

=== 18 ===
- Don Harris, 42, American journalist, he was an NBC News correspondent; in 1975, NBC promoted Harris to the network news staff, where he covered the fall of Saigon and reported from the trenches in Vietnam, American soldiers referred to Harris as "Mr. Lucky" because Harris managed to dodge bullets and avoid land mines, he was killed by members of the Peoples Temple.
- Jim Jones, 47, American cult leader, preacher, and mass murderer; during the mid-1950s, he began to closely associate with the Independent Assemblies of God (IAoG), an international group of churches that embraced the Latter Rain movement,Jones renamed his own church to the "Peoples Temple Christian Church Full Gospel" to associate it with Full Gospel Pentecostalism; the name was later shortened to the Peoples Temple, Jones participated in a series of multi-state revival campaigns with William M. Branham in the second half of the 1950s, Jones claimed to be a follower and promoter of Branham's "Message" during this period, he committed suicide by firearm. His autopsy showed high levels of the barbiturate pentobarbital in his body, which may have been lethal to humans who had not developed physiological tolerance.
- Maria Katsaris, 25, American financial secretary and former teacher's aide, she is known for being one of the most high-ranking figures in the leadership of the Peoples Temple and one of Jim Jones' lovers, she died along with over 900 other Jonestown residents, though unlike the vast majority of the victims, she died in Jim Jones' cabin, the cause of death was assessed as probable cyanide poisoning. A coroner's jury in Guyana ruled that of the victims of Jonestown, only Katsaris and Anne Moore, another of Jones' mistresses, had committed suicide of their own free will.
- Carolyn Moore Layton, 33, American teacher, she was a leadership figure within the Peoples Temple and a long-term partner of Temple leader Jim Jones, some who were close to Layton noted a change in her personality after she began her affair with Jones, as she went from an amusing and free-thinking young woman to a "ruthless authoritarian"; while never occupying a public position within the Temple, she became known as Jones' "Go to Guy", she died of cyanide poisoning in Jones' cabin. Her body was one of only seven of the 909 fatalities in Jonestown to be autopsied.
- Odette Myrtil, 80, French-born American actress, singer, violinist, and costume designer, in the early 1950s, she spent several years in portraying Bloody Mary in the original run of Rodgers and Hammerstein's South Pacific, having succeeded Juanita Hall in the role.
- Leo Ryan, 53, American politician and teacher, he served as the representative of California's 11th congressional district from 1973 until his death in office in 1978, during his time in Congress, Ryan went to Newfoundland to investigate the inhumane killing of seals, and became famous for his vocal criticism of the lack of Congressional oversight of the Central Intelligence Agency (CIA), authoring the Hughes–Ryan Amendment, which would have required extensive CIA notification of Congress about covert operations, he was assassinated by members of the Peoples Temple, the gunmen riddled Ryan's body with over 20 bullets before shooting him in the face.

=== 20 ===
- Robert Alan Aurthur, 56, American screenwriter, film director, and film producer, he wrote two teleplays for the anthology series Playhouse 90, one of them, A Sound of Different Drummers (October 3, 1957), borrowed so heavily from Ray Bradbury's dystopian novel Fahrenheit 451 (1953) that Bradbury sued.
- Giorgio de Chirico, 90, Greek-Italian artist and writer from Volos, co-founder of a style of painting known as metaphysical painting, his dreamlike works with sharp contrasts of light and shadow often had a vaguely threatening and mysterious quality, de Chirico's conception of metaphysical painting was strongly influenced by his reading of Friedrich Nietzsche, whose style of writing fascinated de Chirico with its suggestions of unseen auguries beneath the appearance of things.
- Scott Newman, 28, American actor, stuntman, and novice cabaret singer, he portrayed an acrophobic firefighter in the disaster film The Towering Inferno (1974), death from a fatal dose of valium, taken in combination with alcoholic beverages and other drugs. Following a motorcycle accident in the fall of 1978, Newnan had started taking painkillers to ease the discomfort of his injuries.

=== 23 ===
- Kate Harrington, 75, American actress; on daytime television, Harrington was the second actress to play Katherine 'Kate' Martin on the soap opera All My Children, a role which she played from early February until August 1970, then Harrington moved on to the role of Marion Conway (#2) on Guiding Light from 1971 until 1972, death caused from the complications of a stroke which she had suffered in 1977.

=== 24 ===
- Warren Weaver, 84, American scientist, mathematician, and science administrator, he was fascinated by Lewis Carroll's Alice's Adventures in Wonderland, in 1964, having built up a collection of 160 versions of the novel in 42 languages, Weaver wrote a book about the translation history of Alice, called Alice in Many Tongues: The Translations of Alice in Wonderland.

=== 26 ===
- Ford Beebe, 90, American screenwriter and film director, better known for directing serial films, the film historian Hal Erickson identified as the best of Beebe's works the serials Flash Gordon's Trip to Mars (1938), Buck Rogers (1939), The Green Hornet (1940), and Don Winslow of the Navy (1942), Beebe's work on Universal Pictures' thriller Night Monster (1942) was praised by Alfred Hitchcock, who was impressed with the speed and economy of the production.

=== 27 ===
- Richard Kelton, 35, American actor, he portrayed the Spock-like science officer Ficus Pandorata in the science fiction comedy television series Quark, death caused by accidental carbon monoxide asphyxiation due to a faulty heater in his trailer. He was killed in the accidet while filming the NBC-TV miniseries Centennial, in which he was to have co-starred. Universal Studios, which produced the TV miniseries, was fined $720 for the failure to provide a proper ventilation system for the trailer to which Kelton had retreated to rehearse his lines.
- Harvey Milk, 48, American politician and the first openly gay man to be elected to public office in California, briefly a member of the San Francisco Board of Supervisors in 1978, his swearing-in made national headlines, as he became the first non-incumbent openly gay man in the United States to win an election for public office, he began his tenure by sponsoring a civil rights bill that outlawed discrimination based on sexual orientation, the ordinance was called the "most stringent and encompassing in the nation", and its passing demonstrated "the growing political power of homosexuals", according to The New York Times, he was assassinated by the former supervisor Dan White, Milk was shot once on the right wrist, twice in the chest, and twice on the head.
- George Moscone, 49, American politician and attorney, he served as the Mayor of San Francisco from 1976 until his death in office in 1978, he ran a grassroots mayoral campaign which drew volunteers from organizations like the Glide Methodist Memorial Church, Delancey Street (a rehabilitation center for ex-convicts) and the Peoples Temple which was initially known as a church preaching racial equality and social justice, but then turned into a fanatical political cult, Moscone's opponent John Barbagelata maintained that the Peoples Temple had committed massive election fraud on behalf of Moscone by busing people in from out of town to vote multiple times under the names of deceased San Francisco residents, in August 1977, after Peoples Temple leader Jim Jones fled to Jonestown following media scrutiny alleging criminal wrongdoing, Moscone announced that his office would not investigate Jones or the Peoples Temple, he was assassinated by the former supervisor Dan White.
- Susan Shaw, 49, English actress, she was trained at the Rank Organisation's Company of Youth, she portrayed Susan Huggett in the film series The Huggetts, playing the part in the films Here Come the Huggetts (1948), Vote for Huggett (1948) and The Huggetts Abroad (1949), her theatre credits included the title role of Peter Pan in a 1951 theatrical version of the story, appearing in a stage version of the police procedural The Blue Lamp (1952), starring in The MacRoary Whirl, which ran in the West End for only three nights (1953), and touring as Mrs de Winter in a stage adaptation of the Gothic novel Rebecca (1961).

=== 28 ===
- André Morell, 69, English actor, he portrayed Doctor John H. Watson, in Hammer Film Productions' version of The Hound of the Baskervilles (1959), he portrayed Bernard Quatermass in Quatermass and the Pit (1958-1959), and he is regarded by several critics as having provided the definitive interpretation of the character, Morell personally found that in later years it was the role for which he was most often remembered by members of the public.

=== Date uncertain ===
- Sogen Kato, 79, Japanese man whose family failed to report his death to the local authorities. His mummified remains were discovered by the police in late July, 2010, lying on a bed, wearing underwear and pajamas, and covered with a blanket. Newspapers that were found in the room dated back three decades to the Shōwa period, suggesting that Kato's death may have occurred around November 1978.

== Sources ==
- Collins, John Andrew (2017). Jim Jones: The Malachi 4 Elijah Prophecy. Dark Mystery Publications. ISBN 978-1548102630.
- Guinn, Jeff (2017). The Road to Jonestown: Jim Jones and People Temple. Simon & Schuster. ISBN 978-1-4767-6382-8.
- Holzhey, Magdalena. Giorgio de Chirico. Cologne: Taschen, 2005 ISBN 3-8228-4152-8
- Kinnard, Roy (2008). The Flash Gordon Serials, 1936-1940: A Heavily Illustrated Guide. McFarland & Company. ISBN 978-0786455003.
- Pixley, Andrew (2005). The Quatermass Collection – Viewing Notes. London: BBC Worldwide. pp. 48 pages. BBCDVD1478.
- Reiterman, Tim; Jacobs, John (1982), Raven: The Untold Story of Rev. Jim Jones and His People, Dutton, ISBN 0525241361
