= Wilford (surname) =

Wilford is a surname. Notable people with the surname include:

- Aron Wilford (born 1982), English footballer
- Debbie Wilford (born 1961), New Zealand lawn bowler
- Derek Wilford (1933–2023), British Army officer
- Elizabeth Wilford (died 1559), English founding member of the Muscovy Company
- Ernest Wilford (born 1979), American football player
- Francis Wilford (1761–1822), Hanoverian Indologist and Orientalist
- Francis Wilford-Smith (1927–2009), British cartoonist, graphic artist, and blues specialist
- Sir James Wilford (1516–1550), English soldier
- John Wilford (MP) (died 1418), English politician
- John Wilford (fl.1723–1742), English bookseller
- John Noble Wilford (1933–2025), American journalist and author
- Jwalshik Wilford (born 1968), Nigerian chemist
- Mark Wilford (born 1959), American climber
- Marty Wilford (born 1977), Canadian ice hockey player
- Michael Wilford (1938–2023), English architect
- Michael Wilford (diplomat) (1922–2006), British diplomat
- Richard Wilford, British horticulturist
- Ronald A. Wilford (1927–2015), American music manager
- Sara Wilford (1932–2021), American psychologist
- Sir Thomas Wilford (1870–1939), New Zealand politician
- William Wilford (died 1413), English politician

== See also ==
- Willeford
- Includes any persons with "Wilford" as first name
