= Fosburgh =

Fosburgh is a surname. Notable people with the surname include:

- James Whitney Fosburgh (1910–1978), American painter
- Lacey Fosburgh (1942–1993), American journalist
