= Konstantinos Papadakis =

Konstantinos Papadakis may refer to:

- Konstantinos Papadakis (pianist) (born 1972), Greek pianist
- Konstantinos Papadakis (politician) (born 1975), Greek politician
- Konstantinos Papadakis (basketball) (born 1998), Greek basketball player or Panathinaikos
