= SS Harvey Cushing =

Liberty ship of WWII

History

United States
- Name: Harvey Cushing
- Namesake: Harvey Cushing
- Owner: War Shipping Administration (WSA)
- Operator: Marine Transport Lines, Inc.
- Ordered: as type (EC2-S-C1) hull, MC hull 1210
- Builder: St. Johns River Shipbuilding Company, Jacksonville, Florida
- Cost: $1,455,316
- Yard number: 18
- Way number: 6
- Laid down: 5 September 1943
- Launched: 31 October 1943
- Sponsored by: Betsey Cushing Roosevelt Whitney
- Completed: 11 November 1943
- Identification: Call sign: KUJO
- Fate: Laid up in the, National Defense Reserve Fleet, Mobile, Alabama, 30 August 1946; Sold for commercial use, 9 December 1946, removed from fleet, 25 February 1947

Italy
- Name: Eretteo
- Owner: Fratelli d'Amico
- Operator: A.F. Klaveness & Co.
- Fate: Grounded, 20 September 1965, refloated and scrapped

General characteristics
- Class & type: Liberty ship; type EC2-S-C1, standard
- Tonnage: 10,865 LT DWT; 7,176 GRT
- Displacement: 3,380 long tons (3,434 t) (light); 14,245 long tons (14,474 t) (max)
- Length: 441 feet 6 inches (135 m) oa; 416 feet (127 m) pp; 427 feet (130 m) lwl
- Beam: 57 feet (17 m)
- Draft: 27 ft 9.25 in (8.4646 m)
- Installed power: 2 × Oil fired 450 °F (232 °C) boilers, operating at 220 psi (1,500 kPa); 2,500 hp (1,900 kW)
- Propulsion: 1 × triple-expansion steam engine, (manufactured by General Machinery Corp., Hamilton, Ohio); 1 × screw propeller
- Speed: 11.5 knots (21.3 km/h; 13.2 mph)
- Capacity: 562,608 cubic feet (15,931 m^{3}) (grain); 499,573 cubic feet (14,146 m^{3}) (bale)
- Complement: 38–62 USMM; 21–40 USNAG
- Armament: Varied by ship; Bow-mounted 3-inch (76 mm)/50-caliber gun; Stern-mounted 4-inch (102 mm)/50-caliber gun; 2–8 × single 20-millimeter (0.79 in) Oerlikon anti-aircraft (AA) cannons and/or, 2–8 × 37-millimeter (1.46 in) M1 AA guns

SS Harvey Cushing was a Liberty ship built in the United States during World War II. She was named after Harvey Cushing, an American neurosurgeon, pathologist, writer and draftsman. A pioneer of brain surgery, he was the first exclusive neurosurgeon and the first person to describe Cushing's disease.

== Construction ==
Harvey Cushing was laid down on 5 September 1943, under a Maritime Commission (MARCOM) contract, MC hull 1210, by the St. Johns River Shipbuilding Company, Jacksonville, Florida; she was sponsored by Betsey Cushing Roosevelt Whitney, the daughter of the namesake, and was launched on 31 October 1943.

== History ==
She was allocated to Marine Transport Lines, Inc., on 11 November 1943. On 30 August 1946, she was laid up in the National Defense Reserve Fleet, Mobile, Alabama. She was sold for commercial use, 9 December 1946, to the government of Italy, for $544,506. She was removed from the fleet on 25 February 1947. Harvey Cushing was renamed Eretteo and reflagged in Italy. On 20 September 1965, she ran aground on Sakhalin Island, and broke in two. She was refloated by the Soviet Union and towed to Sovetskaya Gavan, where she was most likely scrapped.

== Bibliography ==
- "St. John's River Shipbuilding, Jacksonville FL". www.ShipbuildingHistory.com. 16 October 2010.
- Maritime Administration. "Harvey Cushing". Ship History Database Vessel Status Card. U.S. Department of Transportation, Maritime Administration.
- Davies, James (May 2004). "Specifications (As-Built)" (PDF). p. 23.
- "SS Harvey Cushing".
