= Harvey Cushing =

American neurosurgeon (1869–1939)

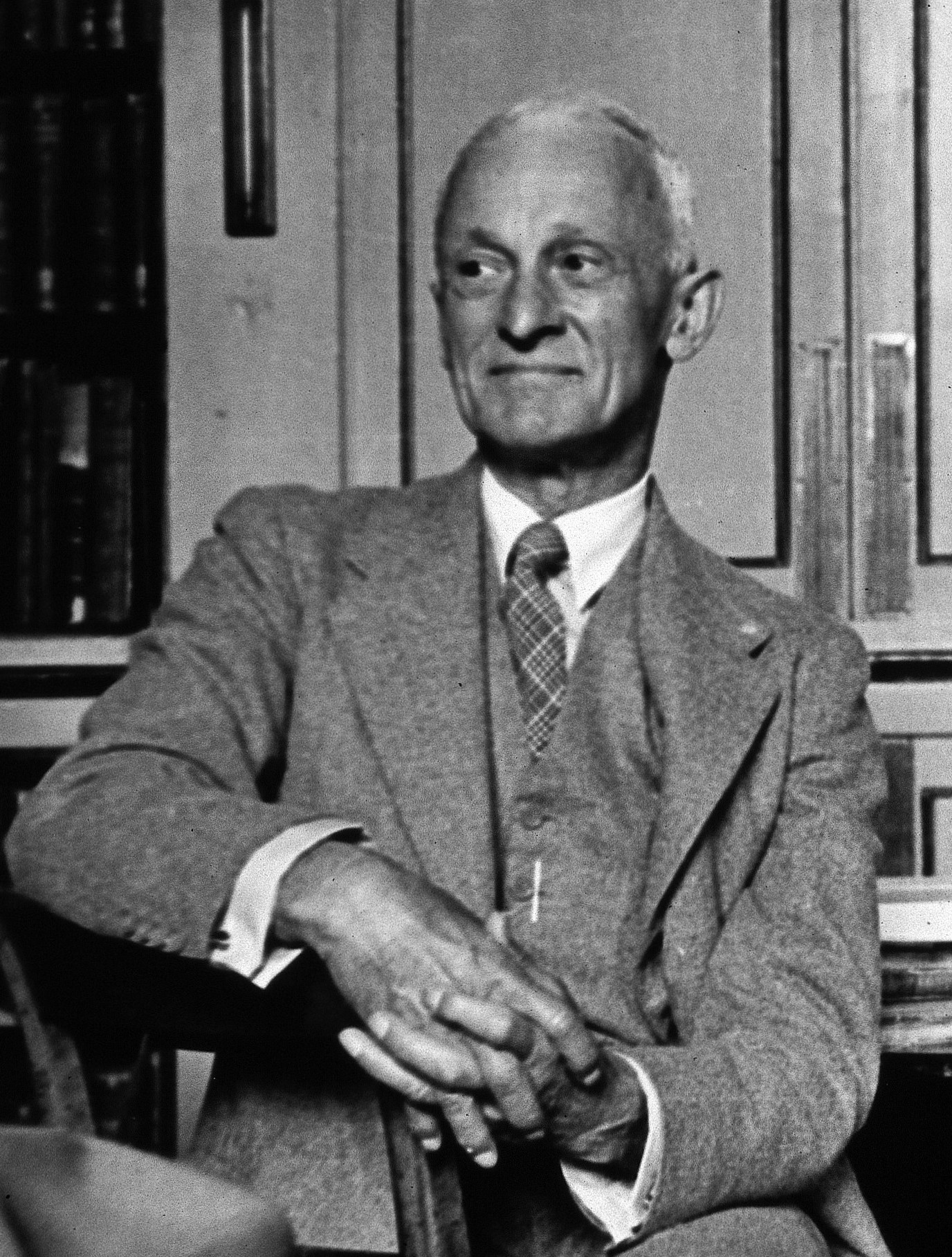
- Harvey Cushing in 1938
- Born: Harvey Williams Cushing; April 8, 1869; Cleveland, Ohio, U.S.
- Died: October 7, 1939 (aged 70); New Haven, Connecticut, U.S.
- Education: Yale University (BA); Harvard University (MD)
- Years active: 1895–1935
- Known for: Pioneering brain surgery; Cushing's syndrome
- Children: 5, including Mary, Betsey, and Barbara
- Medical career
- Profession: Surgeon; neurosurgeon, medical writer
- Institutions: Private practice (Baltimore); Johns Hopkins Hospital (Associate Professor of Surgery, c. 1891); Peter Bent Brigham Hospital and (surgeon-in-chief); Harvard Medical; Yale School of Medicine (Sterling Professor of Medicine in Neurology, 1933–1937)
- Awards: Fellow of American Academy of Arts and Sciences; Cameron Prize for Therapeutics of the University of Edinburgh (1924); Pulitzer Prize (1926); Lister Medal (1930)

Harvey Williams Cushing (April 8, 1869 – October 7, 1939) was an American neurosurgeon, pathologist, writer, and draftsman. Known as the "father of modern neurosurgery," he was the first exclusive neurosurgeon and the first person to describe Cushing's disease. He wrote a biography of physician William Osler in three volumes.

== Early life and education ==
Cushing was born in Cleveland, Ohio. His parents were Elizabeth Maria "Betsey M." Williams (sister of Edward and Charles Williams) and Henry Kirke Cushing, a physician whose ancestors came to Hingham, Massachusetts, as Puritans in the 17th century. Harvey, the fourth generation of a line of physicians founded by his great-grandfather Dr. David Cushing (1768–1814), was the youngest of ten children.

As a child, Cushing attended the Cleveland Manual Training School, which expanded his interest in science and medicine. The school's emphasis on experimental training and a "physics-focused" approach to education played an important role in influencing Cushing toward a career in medical surgery. The school's manual dexterity training program also contributed to Cushing's future success as a surgeon.

He graduated with an B.A. degree in 1891 from Yale University, where he was a member of Scroll and Key and Delta Kappa Epsilon (Phi chapter). He studied medicine at Harvard Medical School and earned his medical degree in 1895. Cushing completed his internship at Massachusetts General Hospital and then did a residency in surgery under the guidance of pioneering surgeon William Stewart Halsted at the Johns Hopkins Hospital in Baltimore.

He subsequently trained in neurological surgery abroad under Emil Theodor Kocher at Bern and Charles Scott Sherrington at Liverpool.

== Career ==
Cushing began his career in private practice in Baltimore. During his time with Kocher, he first encountered the Cushing reflex, which describes the relationship between blood pressure and intracranial pressure. At the age of 32, he was made associate professor of surgery at Johns Hopkins Hospital and was placed in full charge of cases of surgery of the central nervous system. He wrote numerous monographs on surgery of the brain and spinal column and made important contributions in bacteriology. He conducted (with Vakil) a study of intracerebral pressure and (with Sherrington) contributed much to the localization of the cerebral centers.

In Baltimore, he developed the method of operating with local anesthesia, and his paper on its use in hernia gave him a European reputation. In 1911, he was appointed surgeon-in-chief at the Peter Bent Brigham Hospital in Boston. He became a professor of surgery at the Harvard Medical School starting in 1912. In 1913, he was made an honorary F.R.C.S. (London). He was elected a Fellow of the American Academy of Arts and Sciences in 1914. In 1915, before the Clinical Congress of Surgeons in Boston, he showed the possibility of influencing stature by operating on the pituitary gland. In 1924, Cushing was awarded the Cameron Prize for Therapeutics of the University of Edinburgh.

=== World War I ===
Shortly after the entry of the United States into World War I, Cushing was commissioned as a major in the U.S. Army Medical Corps on May 5, 1917. He was director of American Base Hospital No. 5, which was attached to the British Expeditionary Force in France. Cushing also served as the head of a surgical unit in a French military hospital outside of Paris. During his time at the French military hospital, Cushing experimented with the use of electromagnets to extract metallic shrapnel fragments that were lodged within the brain. He was mentioned in a dispatch by Field Marshal Sir Douglas Haig in November 1917.

On June 6, 1918, he was promoted to lieutenant colonel and was assigned as senior consultant in neurological surgery for the American Expeditionary Forces in Europe. In early October, while in France, he came down with what he described as "the grippe," which was probably the Spanish flu. He would never fully recover. He attained the rank of colonel (O-6) on October 23, 1918. In that capacity, he treated Lieutenant Edward Revere Osler, who was fatally wounded during the third battle of Ypres. Lieutenant Osler was the son of Sir William Osler.

Cushing returned to the United States in February 1919 and was discharged on April 9, 1919. In recognition of his service during the war, Cushing was invested as a Companion of the Bath by the British government. In 1923, he was awarded the Distinguished Service Medal by the U.S. Army.

=== Later career ===
Cushing authored the Pulitzer prize-winning biography, Life of Sir William Osler (London: Oxford University Press, 1925).

From 1933 to 1937, when he retired, he worked at the Yale School of Medicine as Sterling Professor of Neurology.

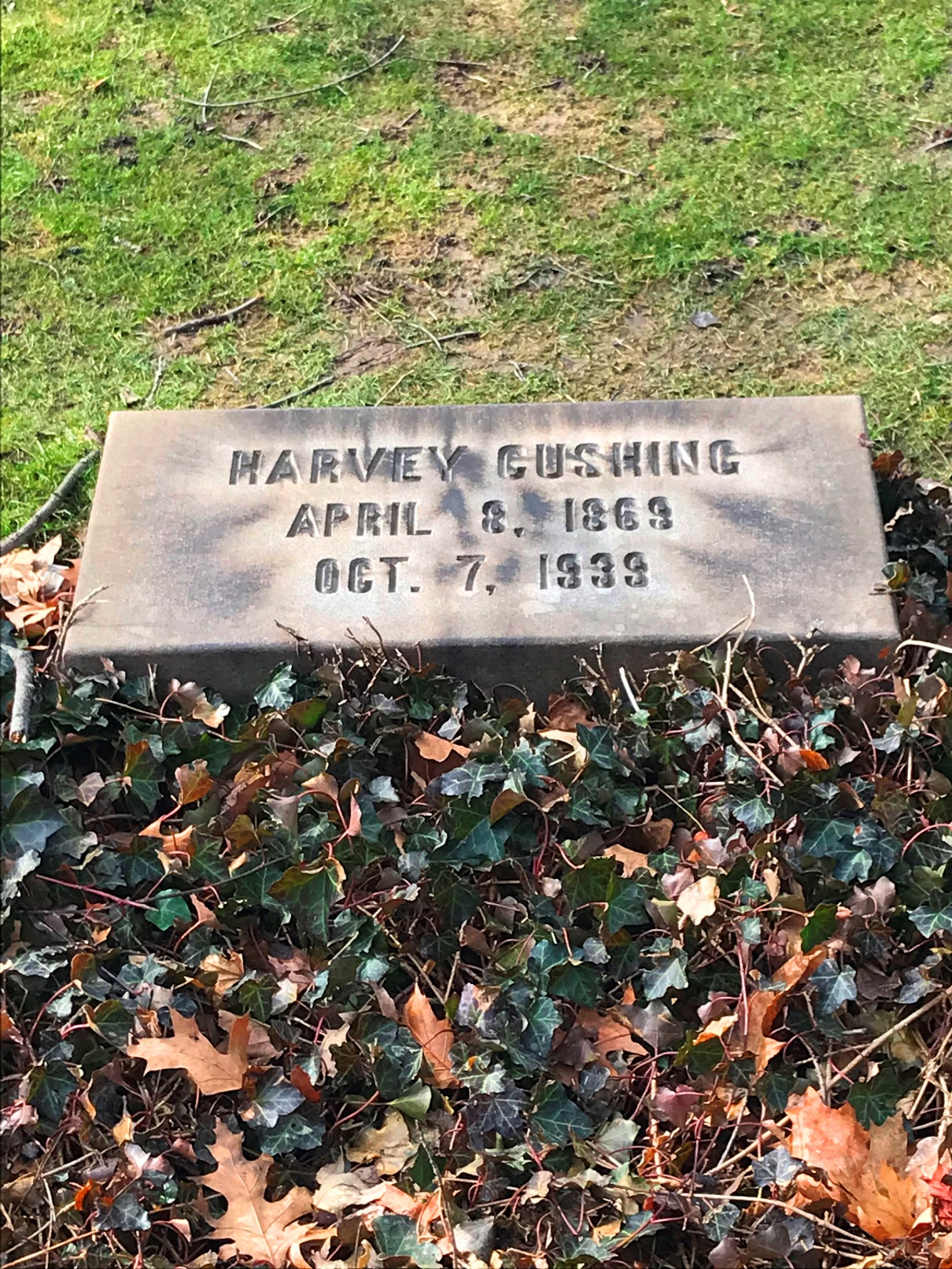
Harvey Cushing's tomb, Lake View Cemetery, Cleveland, Ohio

== Personal life ==
Cushing married his Cleveland childhood friend Katharine Stone Crowell (1870–1949), granddaughter of Ohio congressman John Crowell, on June 10, 1902. They had five children, including three daughters famed for their beauty and collectively known as the 'Cushing sisters':

- William Harvey Cushing (1903–1926) (died in an automobile accident while a student at Yale University)
- Mary Benedict "Minnie" Cushing (1906–1978), who married Vincent Astor and later James Whitney Fosburgh;
- Betsey Cushing (1908–1998), who married James Roosevelt and later John Hay Whitney;
- Henry Kirke Cushing (1910–1983), who married Marjorie Estabrook in 1936.
- Barbara "Babe" Cushing (1915–1978), the socialite wife of Stanley Grafton Mortimer and later William S. Paley.

Cushing died on October 7, 1939, in New Haven, Connecticut, from complications of a myocardial infarction. He was interred at Lake View Cemetery in Cleveland. An autopsy performed on Cushing revealed that his brain harbored a colloid cyst of the third ventricle.

== Legacy ==
At the beginning of the 20th century, Cushing developed many of the basic surgical techniques for operating on the brain. This established him as one of the foremost leaders and experts in the field. Under his influence, neurosurgery became a new and autonomous surgical discipline.

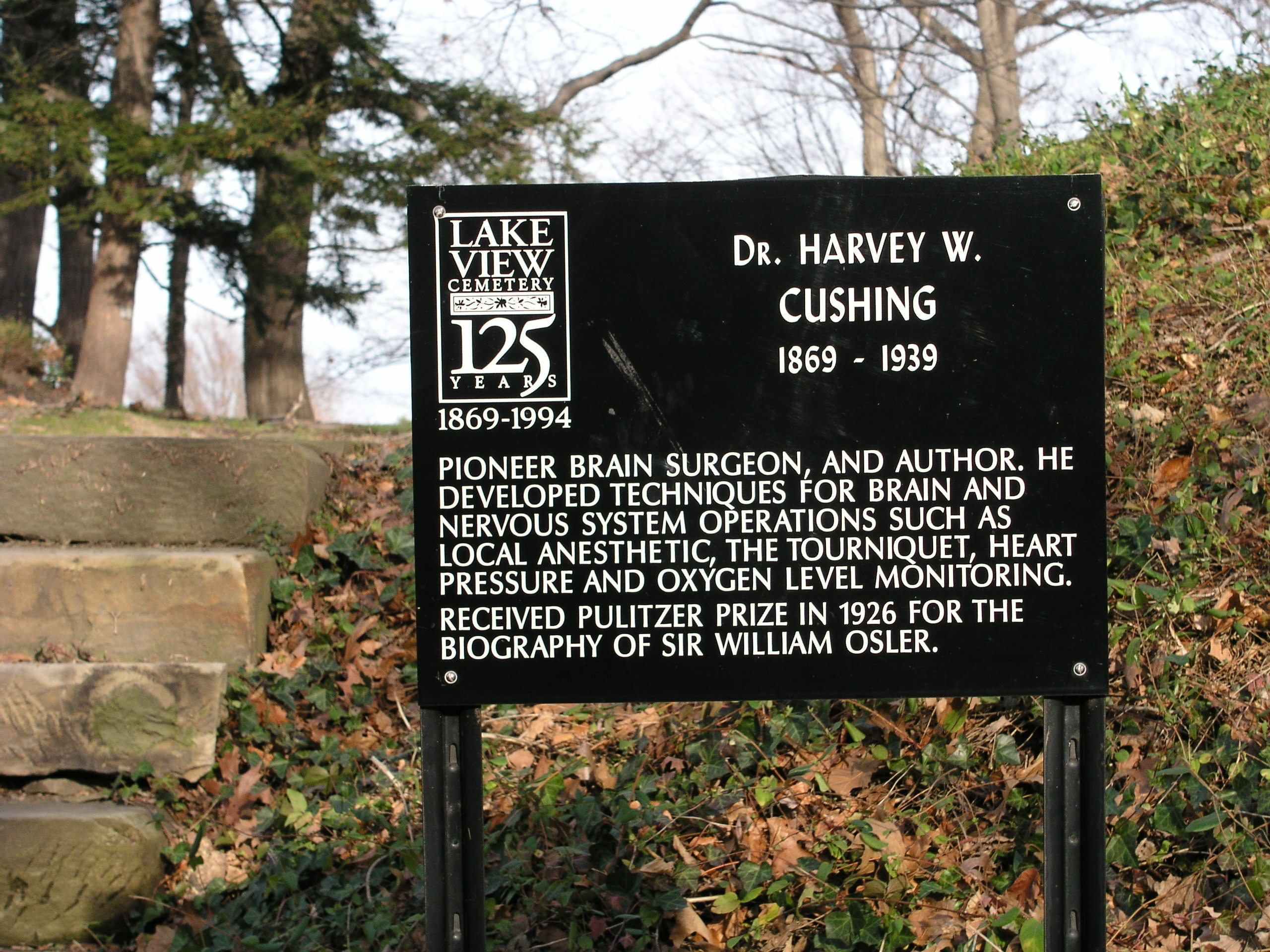
Historical marker at Lake View Cemetery, Cleveland

- He considerably improved the survival of patients after difficult brain operations for intracranial tumors.
- He used X-ray to diagnose brain tumors.
- He used electrical stimuli for the study of the human sensory cortex.
- He played a pivotal role in development of the Bovie electrocautery tool with William T. Bovie, a physicist.
- He was the world's leading teacher of neurosurgeons in the first decades of the 20th century.

Arguably, Cushing's greatest contribution came with his introduction to North America of blood pressure measurement. Upon visiting colleague Scipione Riva-Rocci, an Italian physician, Cushing was astonished by Riva-Rocci's non-invasive way of measuring intra-arterial pressure. In 1896, Riva-Rocci developed a wall-mounted mercury manometer linked to a balloon-inflated cuff that would measure the pressure needed to compress arterial systolic pressure, i.e. systolic blood pressure measurement. Riva-Rocci's design was based on a more primitive version developed by French physician Pierre Potain. Cushing returned to the US with a sample of Riva-Rocci's sphygmomanometer and blood pressure measurement became a vital sign. The use of the Riva-Rocci sphygmomanometer as a diagnostic tool rapidly spread across the US and Western world, a direct contribution by Harvey Cushing. The device's use continued until Russian physician Nikolai Korotkov included diastolic blood pressure measurement in 1905 (after he discovered the famed "Korotkoff sounds") with his improved sphygmomanometer, which also replaced the mercury manometer with a smaller, round dial manometer.

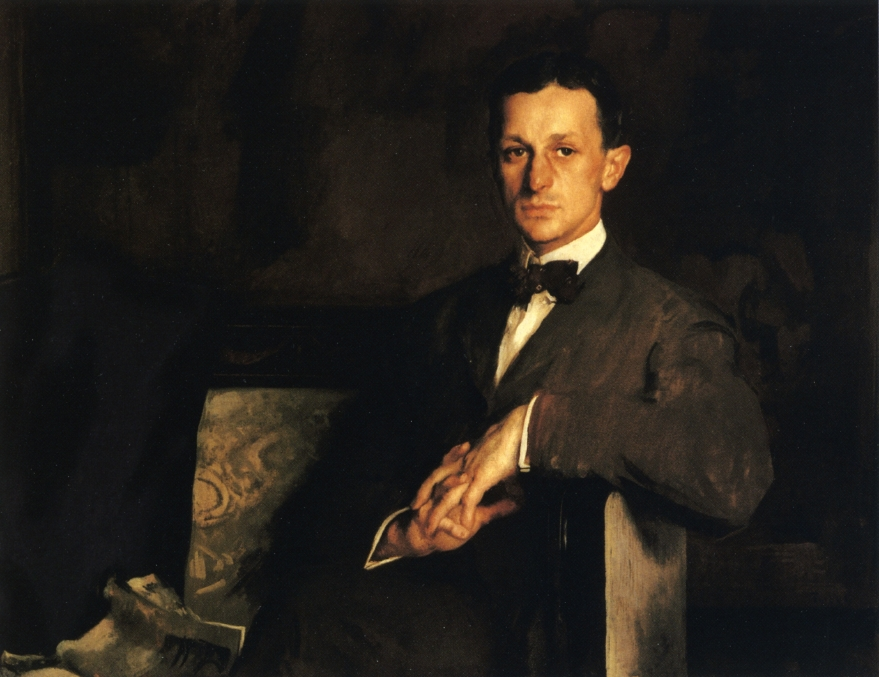
Dr. Harvey Cushing, 1908; oil on canvas, Edmund C. Tarbell

Cushing's name is commonly associated with his most famous discovery, Cushing's disease. In 1912 he reported in a study an endocrinological syndrome caused by a malfunction of the pituitary gland which he termed "polyglandular syndrome." He published his findings in 1932 as "The Basophil Adenomas of the Pituitary Body and Their Clinical Manifestations: pituitary Basophilism".

Cushing was elected to the American Academy of Arts and Sciences in 1914. In 1917, Cushing was elected to the United States National Academy of Sciences. Cushing was also awarded the 1926 Pulitzer Prize for Biography or Autobiography for a book recounting the life of one of the fathers of modern medicine, Sir William Osler. In 1930, Cushing was awarded the Lister Medal for his contributions to surgical science. As part of the award, he delivered the Lister Memorial Lecture at the Royal College of Surgeons of England in July 1930. That same year, he was elected to the American Philosophical Society. Cushing was elected to the Royal Swedish Academy of Sciences in 1934, and a Fellow of the Royal Society of London. He served as president of the History of Science Society in 1934. Cushing was also a candidate for the Nobel Prize in Physiology or Medicine, nominated at least 38 times.

The World War II Liberty Ship SS Harvey Cushing was named in his honor. Cushing General Hospital (now Cushing Memorial Park) in Framingham, Massachusetts, was named for him.

In 1988, the United States Postal Service issued a 45-cent postage stamp in his honor, as part of the Great Americans series.

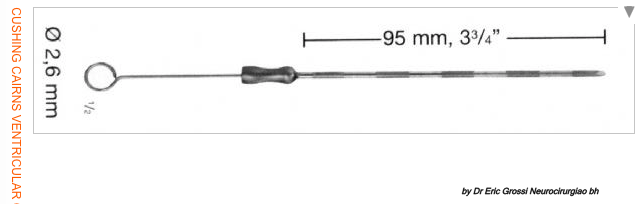
Cushing ventricular cannula

Cushing developed many surgical instruments that are in use today, most notably Cushing forceps and the Cushing ventricular cannula. The forceps instrument is used to grasp the thick tissues of the scalp during cranial surgery and the cannula is used to enter the brain ventricles for CSF drainage. He also developed a surgical magnet while working with the Harvard Medical Unit in France during World War I to extract shrapnel from the heads of wounded soldiers.

The Harvey Cushing/John Hay Whitney Medical Library at Yale University contains extensive collections in the field of medicine and the history of medicine. Cushing's long-time personal secretary, Madeline Stanton, played a major role in organizing his rare book donations, along with those from John F. Fulton and Arnold C. Klebs, to form the library. In 2005, the library released portions of its collection online, including the Peter Parker Collection which consists of a collection of portrait engravings and 83 mid-19th-century oil paintings rendered by artist Lam Qua of Chinese tumor patients, and a biography of Harvey Cushing by John F. Fulton. In 2010, Yale placed on display Cushing's collection of brain specimens. There is also a collection of his papers at the National Library of Medicine.

=== Trained under Cushing ===
- Walter Dandy, the first pediatric neurosurgeon and the developer of pneumoencephalography
- Leo M. Davidoff, founder of the Department of Neurological Surgery at the Albert Einstein College of Medicine
- Norman Dott
- Louise Eisenhardt, Neuropathologist and curator of Cushing's brain tumor registry with more than 2000 specimens.
- Wilder Penfield, pioneer neurosurgeon and founder of the Montreal Neurological Institute

== Selected publications ==
- The Pituitary Body and its Disorders (1912)
- Tumours of the Nervus Acousticus (1917)
- Blood Vessel Tumours of the Brain (1928)
- Consecratio Medici and other papers (1928)
- From a surgeon's journal, 1915–1918 (1936)
- The Medical Career (1940)
- A Visit to Le Puy-En-Velay (1945)

== See also ==
- History of medicine
- Timeline of medicine and medical technology
