= Vincent Astor =

American businessman and philanthropist (1891–1959)

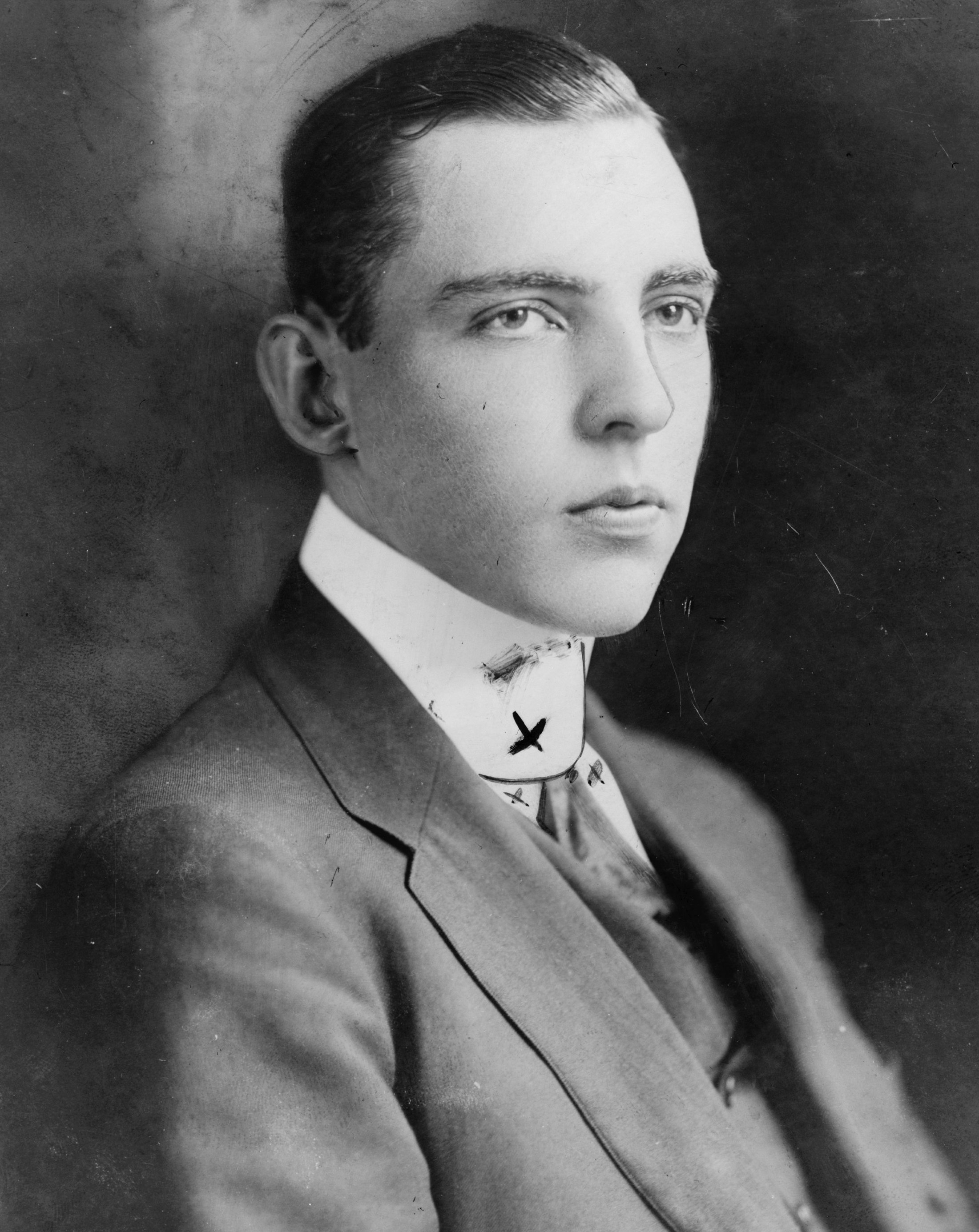
- Astor in 1912
- Born: William Vincent Astor; November 15, 1891; New York City, U.S.
- Died: February 3, 1959 (aged 67); New York City, U.S.
- Burial place: Sleepy Hollow Cemetery, Sleepy Hollow, New York, U.S.
- Occupations: Businessman, philanthropist
- Spouses: Helen Huntington (m. 1914; div. 1940) Mary Benedict Cushing (m. 1940; div. 1953) Brooke Russell (m. 1953)
- Parent(s): John Jacob Astor IV; Ava Lowle Willing
- Relatives: See Astor family

William Vincent Astor (November 15, 1891 – February 3, 1959) was an American businessman, philanthropist, and member of the prominent Astor family.

== Early life ==
Called Vincent, he was born in New York City on November 15, 1891. Astor was the elder child of John Jacob Astor IV, a wealthy businessman and inventor, and his first wife, Ava Lowle Willing, an heiress from Philadelphia.

He graduated in 1910 from St. George's School in Middletown, Rhode Island, and attended Harvard College from 1911 to 1912, leaving school without graduating. In 1912, Vincent Astor's father, John Jacob Astor IV died on the Titanic and left him the biggest fortune at that time and made Vincent Astor one of the richest people in the world.

== Interests ==
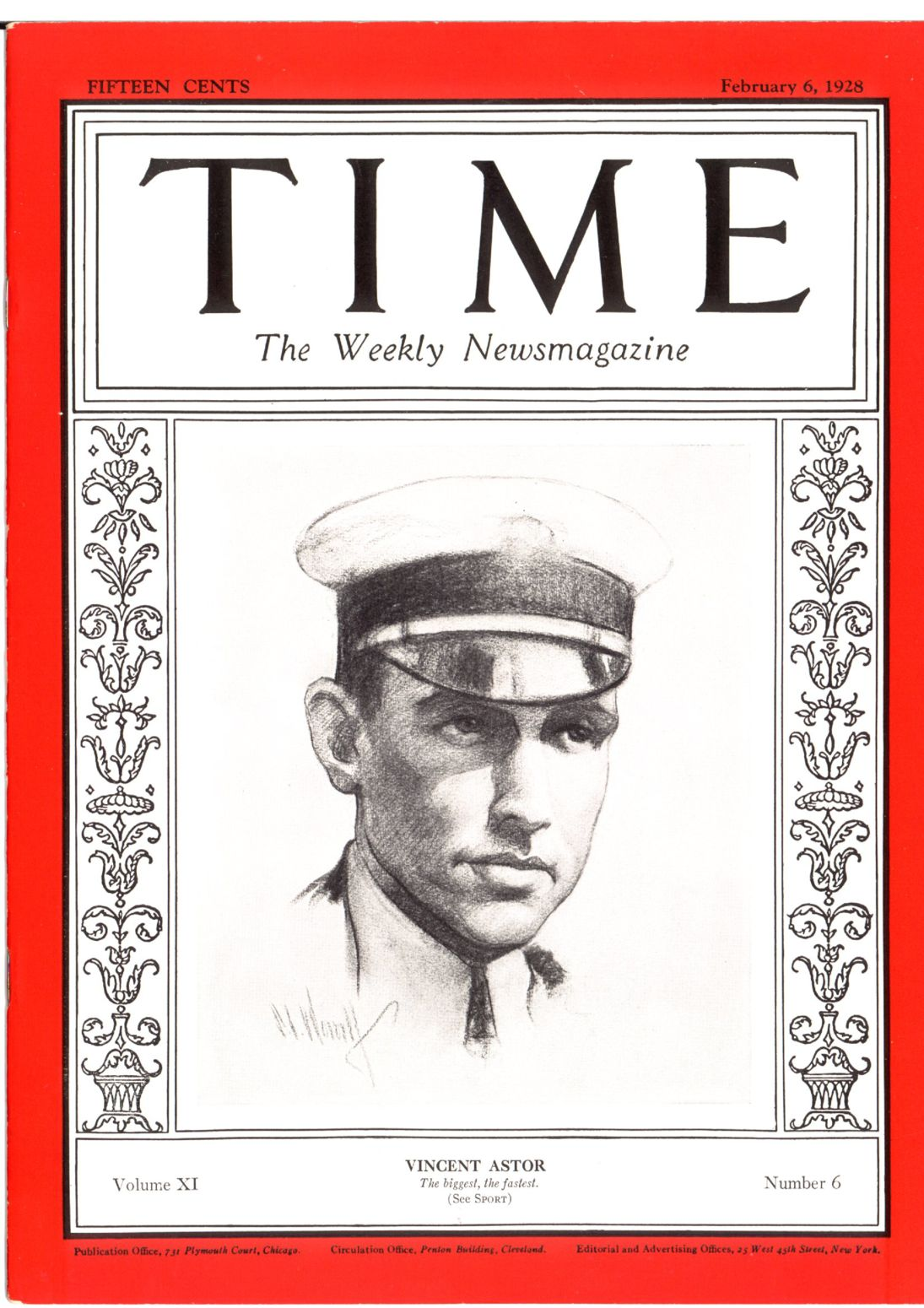
On the cover of Time, February 6, 1928

Like his father, Astor belonged to the New York Society of Colonial Wars. Having joined the U.S. Naval Reserve Force prior to America's entry to the First World War, he was called to active duty on April 7, 1917, and was later promoted to Lieutenant. As executive officer aboard the armed yacht USS Aphrodite he saw service escorting convoys and was aboard when she struck a mine on January 10, 1919. Subsequently, Astor was made commodore of the New York Yacht Club from 1928 to 1930.

Astor was interested in trains. In the early 1930s, he established an estate in Bermuda which included a private narrow-gauge railway and union station with the Bermuda Railway. The estate is now divided among several private owners, none of whom are part of the Astor family. As recently as 1992, the remains of some of his rolling stock were visible.

In 1937, Astor became the chairman and chief stockholder of Newsweek magazine. From 1940 to 1959, the magazine was headquartered at the Knickerbocker Building, built by his father. Astor remained the principal owner until his death in 1959. Two years later, The Washington Post Company purchased a controlling stake (59%) of Newsweek magazine from the Vincent Astor Foundation for $8 million.

== Philanthropy ==
Vincent Astor was, according to family biographer Derek Wilson, "a hitherto unknown phenomenon in America: an Astor with a highly developed social conscience." He was 20 when his father died in the sinking of the ocean liner Titanic and, having inherited a massive fortune, he dropped out of Harvard. He set out to change the family's image from that of miserly, aloof slum landlords who enjoyed the good life at the expense of others.

Over time, he sold off the family's New York City slum housing and reinvested in reputable enterprises, while spending a great deal of time and energy helping others. He was responsible for the construction of a large housing complex in the Bronx that included sufficient land for a large children's playground, and in Harlem, he transformed a valuable piece of real estate into another playground for children.

Astor appeared at No. 12 on the first list of America's richest people, compiled by Forbes magazine. His net worth at the time was estimated at $75 million.

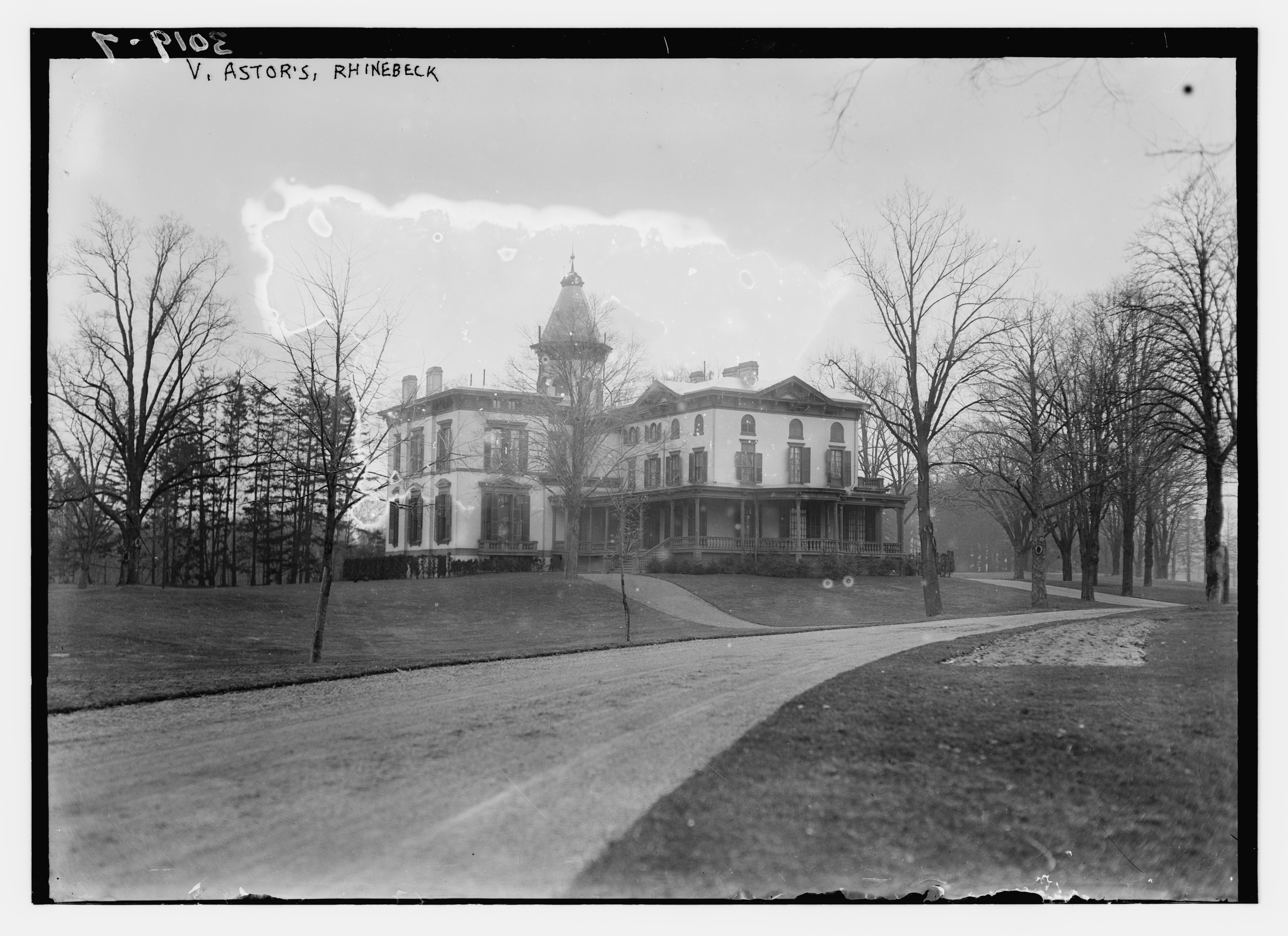
Ferncliff, the Astor family's country estate in Rhinebeck, New York

He also inherited Ferncliff, the Astor family's 2,800-acre (11 km^{2}) estate in Rhinebeck, New York, where his father had been born. However, Vincent Astor would be the last family member to own the estate as well as the final Astor to occupy the "Ferncliff Casino", a Stanford White-designed 1904 Beaux-Arts style 40,000 square feet (3,700 m^{2}) building, which was inspired by the Grand Trianon at Versailles.

On his death in 1959, Astor bequeathed the main house at Ferncliff to the Benedictine Hospital in Kingston, New York. His widow, Brooke, later donated the "Ferncliff Casino" to the Catholic Archdiocese of New York and sold off many parcels of the estate. In 1963, Homer Staley, a retired businessman in the area, asked Brooke Astor to preserve the remaining natural acreage of woodlands from development. She donated the woodlands to the Rotary Club of Rhinebeck, and the land became the Ferncliff Forest Game Refuge and Forest Preserve.

=== The Sinclair-Astor Letters ===
Upton Sinclair, author of The Jungle, wrote Astor an open letter, which he describes in The Brass Check and he also sent to half a dozen newspapers, requesting that he support the Socialist cause and help the poor, at a time when Sinclair claims Astor was erecting a million-dollar estate, without benefiting the rest of society; the only newspaper to publish his letter was a Socialist newspaper, the New York Call. Vincent Astor replied to this letter, and also sent a copy out to half a dozen newspapers, and according to Sinclair, all of them published his reply in full, including the New York Call. Sinclair claimed this was what he considered a scientific demonstration of bias of the media in favor of the wealthy because they gave Astor complete coverage, often on the front page, and, except for the Call, they declined to publish his first letter, and only three of the traditional newspapers published a small portion of his reply to Astor's letter, without featuring it as prominently.

== Marriages ==
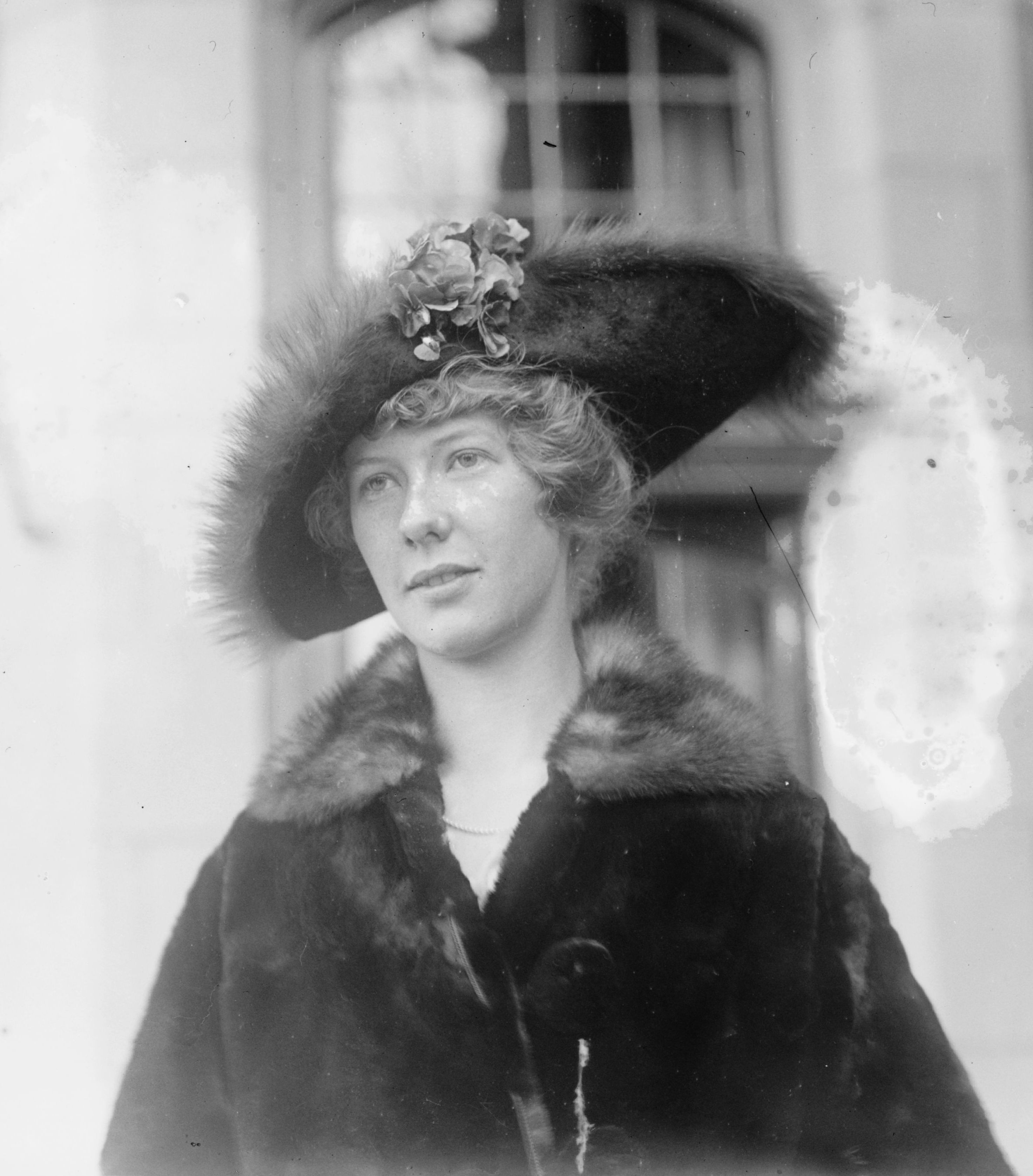
Helen Dinsmore Huntington

Astor married Helen Dinsmore Huntington on April 30, 1914. At the ceremony, he was stricken with the mumps, a disease that made him sterile; as for the bride, her friend Glenway Wescott, the novelist, admiringly described her in his unpublished diaries as "a grand, old-fashioned lesbian." The couple divorced in 1940. A year later, Helen became the second wife of Lytle Hull (1882–1958), a real-estate broker who was a friend and business associate of her former husband.

Shortly after his divorce, Astor married Mary Benedict Cushing, the eldest daughter of Dr. Harvey Williams Cushing and Katharine Stone Crowell. Mary's sisters—the trio were collectively known as the "Cushing Sisters"—were Betsey Maria Cushing and Barbara "Babe" Cushing. Astor and Cushing divorced in September 1953, and the following month, Cushing wed James Whitney Fosburgh, a painter who worked as an art lecturer at the Frick Museum.

On October 8, 1953, several weeks after divorcing his second wife, Astor married the once-divorced, once-widowed Roberta Brooke Russell. According to an often-told story in society circles, Astor agreed to divorce his second wife only after she had found him a replacement spouse. Her first suggestion was Janet Newbold Ryan Stewart Bush, the newly divorced wife of James Smith Bush II, who turned Astor down with startling candor, saying, "I don't even like you." Astor proceeded to tell her that he was not well and, though only in his early 60s, he could not be expected to live for very long, whereupon she would inherit his millions. At that, Janet Bush reportedly replied, "What if you do live?" Mary Cushing then recommended Brooke. Together, Vincent and Brooke developed the Vincent Astor Foundation, a foundation that was designed to give back to New York City. Brooke died in 2007 at the age of 105.

== Wartime service in the United States Navy ==
=== World War I ===
Astor joined the Naval Reserve shortly after it was founded and was commissioned as an ensign on December 28, 1915. He was called to active duty as part of the New York Naval Militia in February 1917 by order of Governor Charles S. Whitman to help guard bridges and aqueducts against possible German sabotage. Astor was assigned to help guard the Brooklyn and Manhattan bridges.

Following the declaration of war against Germany, Astor took advice from his friend and future president Franklin Delano Roosevelt and volunteered for active duty with the Navy on April 7, 1917. He went overseas on June 9 on the USS Noma (Astor's own yacht which had been acquired as a patrol ship by the Navy). He was later assigned to the armed yacht USS Aphrodite.

He was promoted to lieutenant (junior grade) on January 1, 1918, and to lieutenant on July 1, 1918. He was joined in France by his wife, who did charity work with the YMCA at the naval base in Bordeaux, while he served as Port Officer at Royan.

His last assignment was as an officer on the captured German minelaying submarine U-117 during her voyage to the United States. Astor returned to the United States on the U-117 on April 25, 1919, and was discharged on May 24.

After the war, Astor became a companion of the Naval Order of the United States.

=== World War II ===
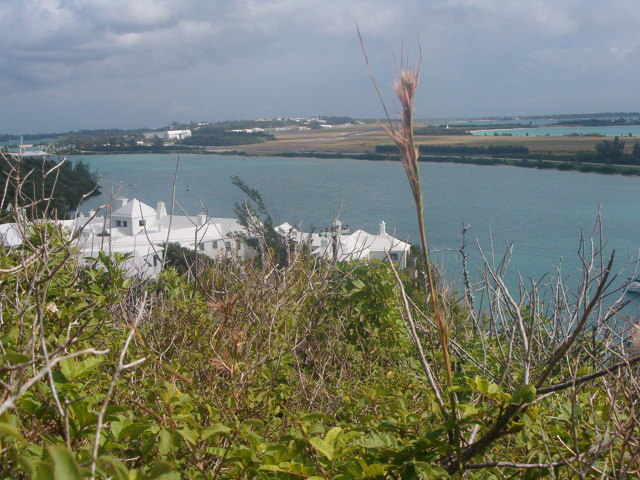
The Astor Estate at Ferry Reach, Bermuda, which Vincent Astor sold after the United States Army built Kindley Field airbase during the Second World War, with the glideslope of the main runway passing directly over his roof.

In the quiet before the war, Astor sailed the Nourmahal in 1938 to Japan on a secret civilian mission for President Franklin D. Roosevelt to gather intelligence on the Japanese naval operations around the Marshall Islands in the Pacific Ocean. As he had done with the Noma in the First World War, he lent his yacht Nourmahal to the Coast Guard for service in the Second World War.

In World War II, Astor again served on active duty with the Navy. He was called to active duty with the rank of commander and given assignment as Area Controller for New York. In this position he coordinated merchant convoys leaving the city. As Area Controller of New York, Astor's principal duty was to coordinate intelligence amongst America's various intelligence agencies. These included U.S. Army Intelligence, U.S. Navy Intelligence, the FBI, and the Department of State. Astor continued to informally provide intelligence to President Roosevelt in addition to his official duties.

Perhaps Astor's longer lasting contributions were his weekly reports from the Chase Bank, where his inside access included USSR account balances. On December 13, 1940, Astor began reporting to the US Treasury the Soviet weekly balances in an unbroken sequence (made by occasional substitutes) up through at least 1945.

During the early months of 1942, Astor suggested equipping fishing boats with radios so they could report U-boat sightings. One boat so equipped was Ernest Hemingway's fishing yacht Pilar.

In June 1943, he was promoted to the rank of captain (with date of rank June 18, 1942).

For his service in the Navy, Captain Astor was awarded the Navy Commendation Medal, Naval Reserve Medal with star, World War I Victory Medal, American Defense Service Medal, American Campaign Medal, and World War II Victory Medal.

== Death ==
Vincent Astor died on February 3, 1959, of a heart attack in his apartment at 120 East End Avenue in Manhattan. He left all of his money to the Vincent Astor Foundation, with Brooke serving as its chairwoman, surprising many. She continued his philanthropic work.

Astor was first interred at his "Ferncliff Casino" estate ("Astor Courts") along the Hudson River in Rhinebeck, New York. The home included an indoor tennis pavilion, two squash courts, and the country's first indoor heated pool. When Brooke Astor later disposed of the property, she had him reinterred in Sleepy Hollow Cemetery in Sleepy Hollow, New York. Brooke is buried beside him.

His half-brother John Jacob Astor VI, known as "Jakey", felt cheated and resentfully stated that Vincent "had the legal, not the moral right to keep all the money". Jakey sued Brooke to inherit his money. He was certain that Vincent was "mentally incompetent" when signing his last will in June 1958 due to frequent smoking and alcoholism, although Brooke insisted otherwise. While Vincent was hospitalized, Brooke often brought him liquor. Jakey accused her of using the liquor to influence the will in her favor. Jakey ended up settling for $250,000. The rest of the money remained with the Vincent Astor Foundation and Brooke.

== Legacy ==
=== Mount Astor ===
A mountain in Antarctica bears Astor's name. Rising to a height of 3,710 m, Mount Astor is located in the Hays Mountains of the Queen Maud Range, and was named by Rear Admiral Richard Byrd on his November 1929 expedition flight to the South Pole. Astor had been a contributing philanthropist to the expedition.

=== Astor Challenge Cup ===
In 1915, Vincent presented the Astor Challenge Cup trophy to the winner of the Astor Cup auto race. The original cup is now held by INDYCAR, LLC, which is a descendant of Carl G. Fisher's Indianapolis Motor Speedway, as both are now owned by Roger Penske. On October 12, 2011, Indycar announced that the Astor Challenge Cup would be presented annually as the new championship trophy for the IndyCar Series. It was first presented to Dario Franchitti on February 13, 2012, during the organisation's State of INDYCAR address at Hilbert Circle Theatre. The winning driver and team owner are each presented with a scaled replica of the trophy during official INDYCAR business meetings. Since 2012, the trophy has been presented at the final race of the season.

== Portrayals ==
- Dennis Envoldsen (2012) - Titanic: The Aftermath (Documentary)
