= Columbia Artists Management =

Talent management agency

Columbia Artists Management (CAMI) was an international talent management agency. On August 29, 2020, the agency announced plans to shut down amid a disturbance in business caused by the "prolonged pandemic environment".

== History ==
Based in New York City, it was formed on December 12, 1930 as Columbia Concerts Corporation by Arthur Judson and William S. Paley, the then head of the Columbia Broadcasting System, who helped merge seven independent concert bureaus in the United States. By 1941, under pressure from government regulators, both CBS and NBC ended their longtime relationships with their respective talent management companies. The independent Columbia Concerts renamed itself as Columbia Artists Management Inc. in 1948. In March 2021, performing arts management company IMG Artists acquired the name and brand of Columbia Artists. CAMI was based at 165 West 57th Street in New York City from 1959 to 2005, when it moved to 1790 Broadway.

During its existence, CAMI has represented a very large number of active classical artists worldwide, including singers Leontyne Price, Elisabeth Schwarzkopf, Renata Tebaldi, Mario Lanza, Mohammed Fairouz, Jussi Björling, John McCormack, Richard Tucker, Paul Robeson, and George London; pianists Vladimir Horowitz, Ronald Turini, Aleksey Sultanov, Arturo Benedetti Michelangeli, and Van Cliburn; violinists Jascha Heifetz, Yehudi Menuhin, Eugene Sarbu and Tossy Spivakovsky; and conductors Leonard Bernstein, Herbert von Karajan, and Otto Klemperer.

Composers Sergei Prokofiev, Igor Stravinsky, and Aaron Copland were managed by CAMI when they appeared as performers. The agency's contemporary roster included conductors Seiji Ozawa, Valery Gergiev and Mirga Gražinytė-Tyla; singers Isabel Leonard, Russell Thomas and Brenda Rae; and pianist Maurizio Pollini.

British music commentator Norman Lebrecht criticized CAMI and Ronald A. Wilford for what Lebrecht deemed to be their overly pervasive influence on conductor salaries, and the limited time music directors spent with orchestras.
