= Willeford =

Willeford is a surname. Notable people with the surname include:

- Charles Willeford (1919–1988), American writer
- Pamela Willeford (born 1950), U.S. diplomat
- Thomas Willeford (born 1964), American artist and writer
- Stephen Willeford, figure in the 2017 Sutherland Springs church shooting

== See also ==
- Wilford (surname)
