= Babe Paley =

American editor and socialite (1915–1978)

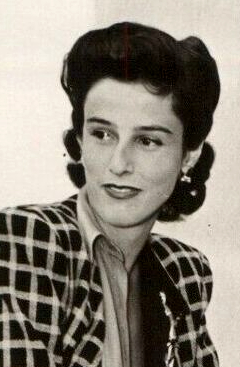
- Born: Barbara Cushing; July 5, 1915; Boston, Massachusetts, U.S.
- Died: July 6, 1978 (aged 63); New York City, U.S.
- Education: Westover School; Winsor School
- Occupations: Magazine editor, socialite
- Years active: 1938–1978
- Spouses: Stanley Grafton Mortimer Jr. (m. 1940; div. 1946) William S. Paley (m. 1947)
- Children: 4, including Amanda Burden
- Parents: Harvey Cushing (father); Katharine Stone Crowell Cushing (mother)
- Relatives: Mary Benedict Cushing (sister); Betsey Cushing (sister)

Barbara Cushing Mortimer Paley (July 5, 1915 – July 6, 1978) was an American magazine editor and socialite. Affectionately known as Babe throughout her life, Paley made contributions to the field of magazine editing. In recognition of her distinctive fashion sense, she was inducted into the International Best Dressed List Hall of Fame in 1958. Together with her two sisters, Minnie and Betsey, she was a popular debutante in her youth and the trio were dubbed "The Fabulous Cushing Sisters" in high society. She was married twice; first, to the sportsman Stanley G. Mortimer Jr. and second, to CBS founder William S. Paley.

== Early life ==
Barbara Cushing Mortimer Paley, born Barbara Cushing in Boston, Massachusetts, was the daughter of renowned brain surgeon Harvey Cushing, who belonged to a prominent Cleveland medical family and held professorships at Johns Hopkins, Harvard, and Yale, and Katharine Stone (née Crowell), a granddaughter of Ohio congressman John Crowell. She spent her formative years in Brookline, Massachusetts. Summers were spent at the family cottage, Little Boar’s Head, on the coast of New Hampshire.

Barbara's father was committed to his career and would spend long hours at his work which meant that his wife was left at home alone with the couple's five children. Though affectionate towards his children when home, he would spend much of his time in his study. Cushing was also stern and demanded perfection.

Within the family Barbara was known as "Baby" or "Babs" which would eventually become the moniker she was known by, Babe.

Barbara had two older sisters, Mary and Betsey, who both entered into unions with affluent families: Mary Cushing became the second wife of Vincent Astor, while Betsey Cushing married twice, first to James Roosevelt, the son of President Franklin D. Roosevelt, and later to John Hay Whitney. Together, the Cushing sisters were often referred to by the public as 'The Fabulous Cushing Sisters'.

Barbara’s oldest brother William died in an automobile accident in 1926, near New Haven where he was attending Yale University. The death of her brother was a devastating blow to Barbara’s parents. While her father threw himself into his work, her mother would attend seances in order to connect with the spirit of her son.

Barbara attended the Westover School in Middlebury, Connecticut where she graduated at the top of her class. In October 1934, she made her debut as a debutante in Boston at the Ritz-Carlton, an event that garnered attention amid the challenges of the Great Depression. Notably, sons of Roosevelt attended her debut. This marked the beginning of her social journey. She completed her high school education at Winsor School in Boston in 1934.

In 1937, Paley was involved in a car accident while returning from a party on Long Island when the drunk male driver crashed into a tree. The accident led to her front teeth being knocked out and a shattered jawbone. Doctors had to reconstruct her jaw and teeth. Later in life there would be rumors that she had undergone plastic surgery.

== Career ==
By 1935 Paley had secured an entry-level job at Glamour magazine and commuted from the Cushing family's home in New Haven.

In 1938, Paley decided to move to Manhattan to live with her sister Betsey and then shared an apartment with her friend Priscilla Weld. Living in New York enabled Paley to land a job as fashion editor at Vogue in 1939. This role granted her access to designer clothing, often obtained in exchange for her high-profile image. In 1941, Time magazine ranked her the world's second-best dressed woman, following Wallis Simpson and preceding Aimée de Heeren. She was also named on the best-dressed lists of 1945 and 1946.

Following her second marriage in 1947, Paley left her position at Vogue.

=== Style ===
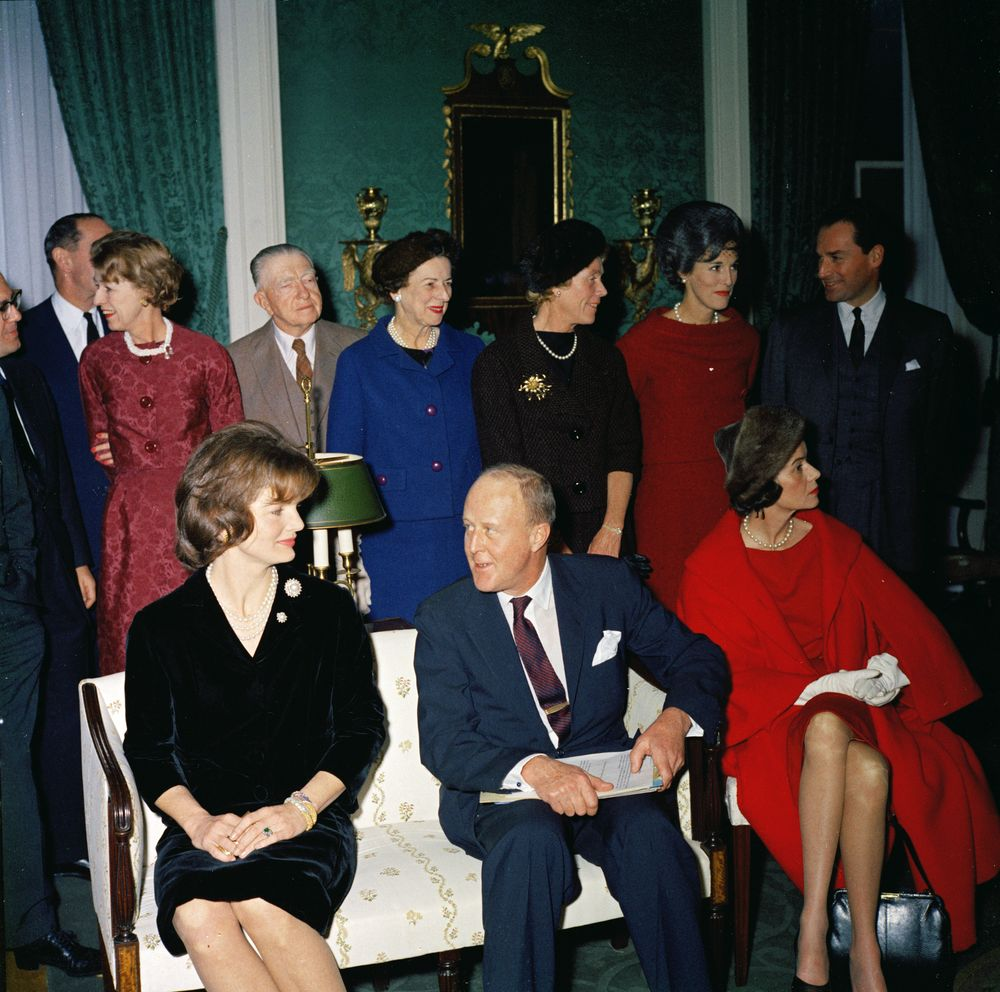
Paley (back row, second from right) at the White House for First Lady Jacqueline Bouvier Kennedy's Tea for the Special Committee for White House Paintings in 1961

Babe and William Paley maintained an apartment at the St. Regis, which was styled by the interior designer Billy Baldwin. They resided there during the week and spent weekends at their 80-acre (32 ha) estate, Kiluna Farm, located in Manhasset, Long Island. In 1957, they acquired Kiluna North, a retreat on Squam Lake in New Hampshire, which afforded them privacy and allowed them to play host to numerous celebrities.

Despite encountering social exclusions and discriminatory practices due to prevalent anti-Semitic prejudices against her husband, the Paleys cultivated a circle of high-society friends that included author Truman Capote and fellow socialite Slim Keith. Capote included Paley and Keith in his group of "swans," comprising New York socialites such as Gloria Guinness, Marella Agnelli, and C.Z. Guest Paley severed her friendship with Capote when he published excerpts from Answered Prayers, his tell-all about New York's elite.

Paley's personal style was considered influential. She was known for combinations such as pairing high-end jewellery by Fulco di Verdura and Jean Schlumberger with costume pieces, and for choices like tying a scarf to her handbag or allowing her hair to go grey naturally. Several of her fashion choices were widely imitated.

Paley appeared on the International Best Dressed List 14 times before being inducted into the Fashion Hall of Fame in 1958. Fashion designer Bill Blass said of her: "You noticed Babe and nothing else."

== Personal life ==
While working at Vogue, Barbara met and married Stanley Grafton Mortimer Jr. (1913–1999), an oil heir and member of a prominent New York family, in 1940 at St. Luke's Episcopal Church in East Hampton, New York. However, their marriage ended by 1946 after Mortimer, upon returning from his service in the Navy during the WWII, became an alcoholic and displayed severe mood swings. Mortimer would decades later be diagnosed with manic depression.

They had two children together:

- Stanley Grafton Mortimer III (born 1942), a Harvard graduate who married Siri Larsen in 1971.
- Amanda Jay Mortimer (born 1944), who married Carter Burden Jr., a descendant of the Vanderbilt family, in 1964. The couple divorced in 1972.

Paley's children grew up at the countryside estate Kiluna Farm in Manhasset,while their mother and father/step-father stayed in New York. Retrospectives have suggested that Barbara neglected her children while pursuing social status and relied on her husbands' wealth to support her extravagant lifestyle. Her daughter Amanda has acknowledged that their relationship was "virtually nonexistent" and that the distance "was her choice, not mine". Through her daughter Amanda, her granddaughter is Flobelle 'Belle' Fairbanks Burden, a lawyer and New York Times Bestseller for her autobiographical book Strangers which describes her childhood summers at Barbara's home.

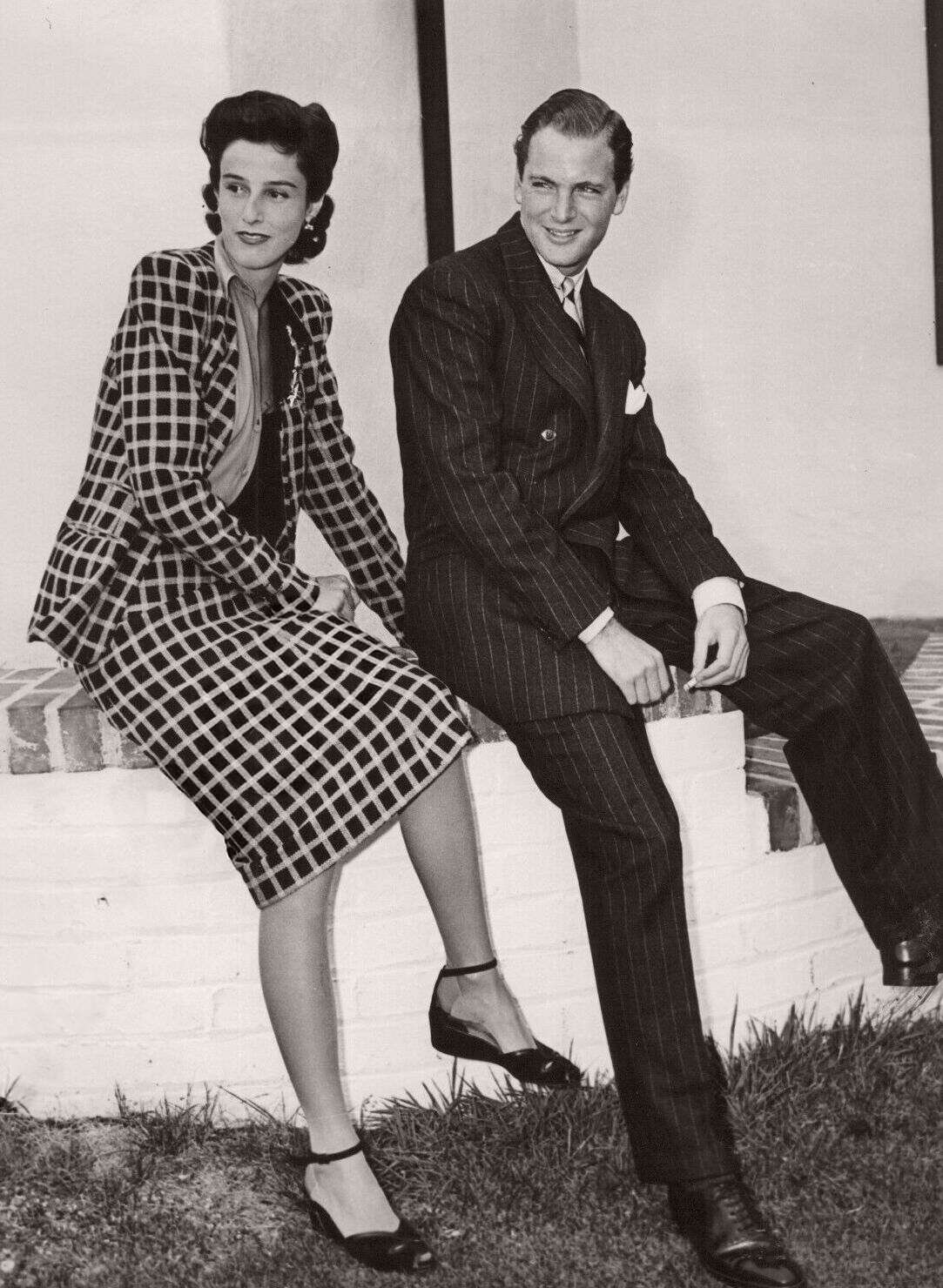
Paley and her husband in 1940

After her divorce from Mortimer, Barbara received a settlement from a trust fund. In 1946, she met William "Pasha" Paley, who was estranged from his wife Dorothy Hart Hearst (1908–1998), the former wife of John Randolph Hearst. William Paley, the chief executive of Columbia Broadcast System or CBS, was wealthy, influential, and interested in the arts, and sought acceptance in New York's café society. Barbara's social connections provided him a better chance of gaining entry into the exclusive circles that had previously eluded him. For Barbara, William Paley offered wealth, security, and worldly experiences. William's divorce was finalized July 24, 1947. He and Barbara married the following year. She had two children with Paley:

- William C. "Bill" Paley (born 1948), who relaunched La Palina, a cigar company established by grandfather Sam Paley in 1896. He married Alison Van Metre, daughter of Albert Van Metre, founder of Van Metre Homes.
- Kate Cushing Paley (born 1950), who made her "nondebut" in 1968, shortly after the assassination of Robert F. Kennedy.

According to several biographers, Barbara experienced loneliness and frustration as William Paley engaged in extramarital affairs. This emotional toll affected her and her family. Moreover, she faced public and media scrutiny, expected to maintain an unrealistic standard of beauty and social grace.

=== Final years and death ===
Paley was diagnosed with lung cancer in 1974. She died on July 6, 1978, a day after her 63rd birthday.

=== Legacy ===
Barbara Paley remains an icon in the realms of fashion and style. Truman Capote, a former friend, reputedly commented, "Babe Paley had only one fault. She was perfect. Otherwise, she was perfect."

== In popular culture ==
The 1969 novel The Love Machine by Jacqueline Susann centers on the characters Judith and Gregory Austin, a socialite and television network CEO reportedly based on Babe and William Paley. Dyan Cannon portrayed socialite Judith in the 1971 film adaptation.

Dramatized across various media, Babe Paley has been portrayed by:

- Joan Severance in the 1998 television film Life of the Party: The Pamela Harriman Story
- Michelle Harrison in the 2005 film Capote
- Sigourney Weaver in the 2006 film Infamous
- Regina Schneider in the first episode of the 2021 Halston miniseries
- Naomi Watts in the 2024 miniseries Feud: Capote vs. The Swans

Additional depictions include:

- The Swans of Fifth Avenue, 2016 novel by Melanie Benjamin, with Babe Paley alongside Capote and Slim Keith
- Swan Song, 2018 novel by Kelleigh Greenberg-Jephcott, with Babe Paley alongside Capote and other "swans", longlisted for the Women's Prize for Fiction in 2019
- The Capote Tapes, 2019 documentary
