= USS Nourmahal =

Gunboat of the United States Navy

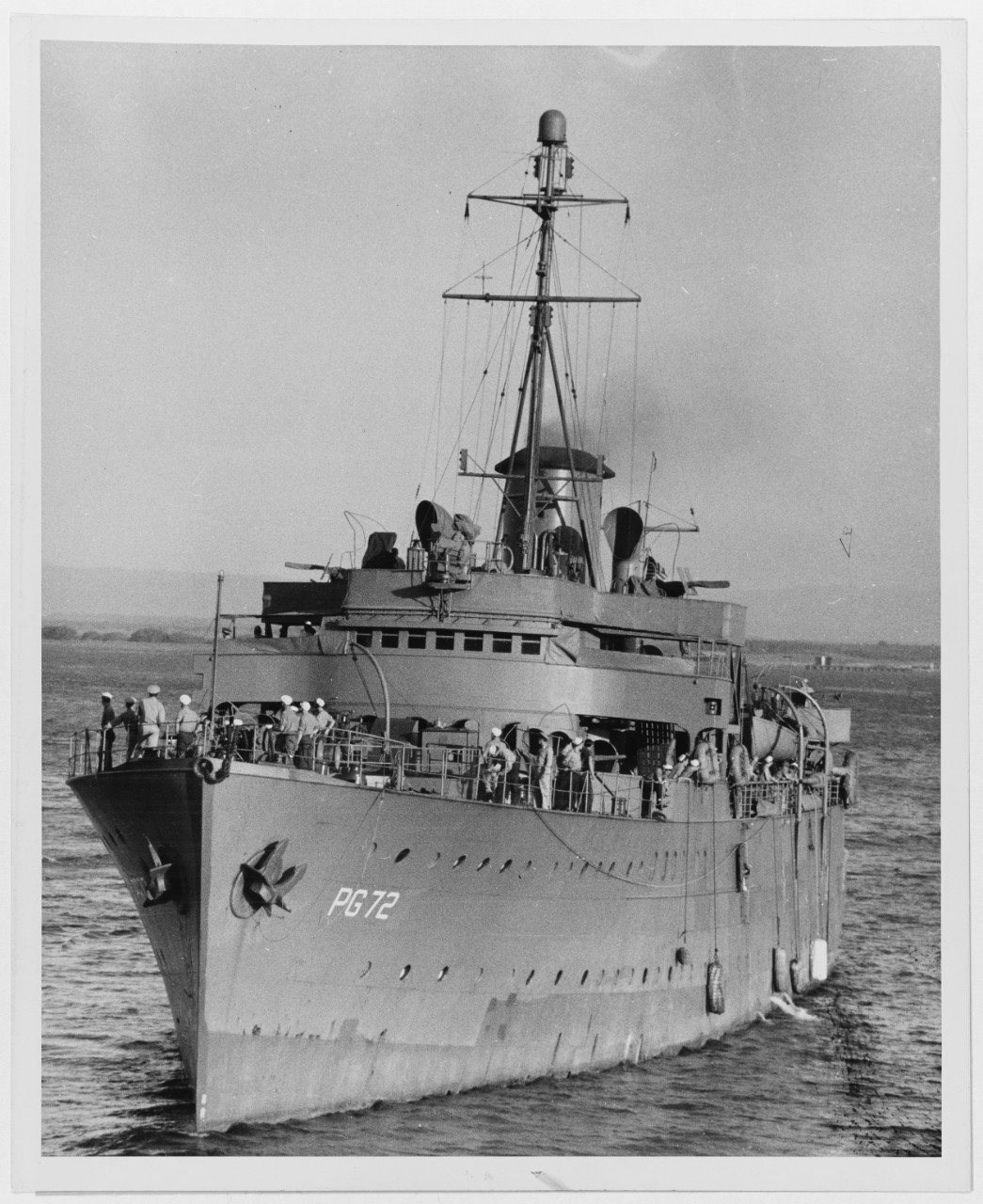
- USS Nourmahal circa 1943

History

United States
- Name: Nourmahal
- Builder: Friedrich Krupp Germaniawerft, Kiel
- Launched: 1928
- Out of service: Acquired by the United States Coast Guard on 21 March 1940

United States
- Name: USCGC Nourmahal
- Acquired: 21 March 1940
- Commissioned: 21 August 1940
- Decommissioned: 30 May 1946
- In service: Returned to Coast Guard on 29 December 1943
- Out of service: Acquired by the United States Navy on 3 March 1942; Transferred on 16 June 1943

United States
- Name: USS Nourmahal
- Acquired: 3 March 1942; Transferred from the Coast Guard on 16 June 1943
- Commissioned: 9 April 1943
- In service: Returned to the Navy in May 1947
- Out of service: Returned to the Coast Guard on 29/31 December 1943
- Stricken: 12 January 1944
- Fate: Up for disposal on 18 July 1948; Sold for scrap on 11 September 1964

General characteristics
- Type: Gunboat
- Displacement: 2,250 long tons (2,290 t) (1941); 3,200 long tons (3,300 t) (1945)
- Length: 263 ft 10 in (80.42 m)
- Beam: 41 ft 6 in (12.65 m)
- Draft: 18 ft 5 in (5.61 m)
- Propulsion: 2 × 1,600 hp (1,200 kW) Sulzer Brothers 6-cylinder diesel engines; two shafts
- Speed: 15 kn (17 mph; 28 km/h)
- Complement: 107 (1941); 111 (1945)
- Armament: 1941; 2 × 4"/50 gun mounts; 6 × .50 cal (12.7 mm) machine guns; 8 × .30 cal (7.62 mm) machine guns; 2 × depth charge tracks; 1945; 2 × 4"/50 gun mounts; 6 × 20 mm mounts; 8 × .30 cal. machine guns; 2 × depth charge tracks; 4 × depth charge projectors; 2 × mousetraps

USS Nourmahal (PG-72) was a gunboat used by the United States Coast Guard and United States Navy during the Second World War.

== Construction ==
The Nourmahal was originally built as a yacht for multi-millionaire Vincent Astor in 1928 at Krupp Iron Works in Kiel, Germany. This was the third Astor family yacht to bear the name, replacing a smaller Nourmahal designed by Cox & Stevens, Inc. and built by Robert Jacob Shipyard, City Island NY., launched March, 1921. Astor was the heir to a large New York real estate fortune after his father, John Jacob Astor IV, died aboard the RMS Titanic in 1912.

== Service history ==
With the outbreak of the Second World War, Nourmahal was acquired by the Coast Guard on 21 March 1940 and was commissioned USCGC Nourmahal (WPG-72) on 21 August 1940. Nourmahal was acquired 3 March 1942 by the Navy from Astor under a bareboat charter agreement under which the vessel was to be operated by the Coast Guard under Navy ownership. Nourmahal was designated (PG-72) 9 April 1943 and purchased by the Navy for $1,000,000 under an option of the charter on 25 June 1943 (29 June in DANFS). She was returned to the Coast Guard on 29 December 1943 and reclassified as WPG-122 and was struck from the Naval Register on 12 January 1944.

=== Post-war ===
Nourmahal was decommissioned on 30 May 1946 and returned to Navy custody in May 1947.

Nourmahal was transferred to the Maritime Administration for disposal on 18 July 1948 and, after several advertisements with no bids accepted the ship remained in the James River Fleet until sold for scrap on 11 September 1964 to Hughes Brothers, Inc. of Hampden, Maine for $27,502. The ship was withdrawn from the fleet on 24 September 1964.

== Awards ==
- American Defense Service Medal
- American Campaign Medal
- World War II Victory Medal
