= Anthony di Bonaventura =

Musician and music professor

- Born: November 12, 1929; Follansbee, West Virginia
- Died: November 12, 2012 (aged 83); Boston, Massachusetts
- Education: New York's Music School Settlement; Curtis Institute of Music
- Spouse: Sara Roosevelt Whitney (m. 1953; div. 1972)
- Children: 5

Anthony di Bonaventura (November 12, 1929 – November 12, 2012) was an American pianist and Professor of Music at Boston University's College of Fine Arts for 40 years. He was the director of a Piano Institute at Colby College Piano Institute (1978–2003) and then at West Chester University (2004–12).

== Early life ==
Anthony di Bonaventura was born on November 12, 1929, in Follansbee, West Virginia. He was the son of Ferdinando di Bonaventura, a barber, and Rosaria "Rose" (née Santomo) di Bonaventura.

Anthony began piano studies at the age of three and gave the first professional concert at the age of four. Then, he won a scholarship to New York's Music School Settlement at six. At thirteen, he appeared as a soloist with the New York Philharmonic. At sixteen, he became a pupil of Isabelle Vengerova and later entered the Curtis Institute of Music, where he continued his studies with Vengerova and graduated with highest honors.

== Career ==
Enthusiastic acclaim by critics and audiences came early in his career. After his Washington debut, Paul Hume of The Washington Post'' wrote: "He can stand with the great players of Mozart's keyboard music." His brilliant performances in an early European tour led to his selection by the great conductor Otto Klemperer to perform the complete Beethoven Concerti at the London Beethoven Festival.

Di Bonaventura gave performances in 28 countries, including appearances with the London Philharmonic, Vienna Symphony, New York Philharmonic, Boston Symphony Orchestra, Philadelphia Orchestra, Chicago Symphony, Royal Philharmonic, Pittsburgh Symphony, San Francisco Symphony, and the Vienna Symphony. He has given solo recitals at Lincoln Center, Kennedy Center, Carnegie Hall, Sydney Opera House, Concertgebouw, and Musikverein, as well as performances at festivals of Spoleto, Ann Arbor, Saratoga, Bergen, Lucca, Zagreb, and Donaueschingen. World premieres of specially written works by Berio, Kelemen, Persichetti, and Ginastera. He made recordings for Columbia, RCA Connoisseur Society, and Sine Qua Non.

Many distinguished composers such as György Ligeti, Luciano Berio, Alberto Ginastera, Milko Kelemen and Vincent Persichetti wrote works especially for him. He premiered Ligeti's Piano Concerto (1986), Ginastera's Piano Sonata No. 2 (1992), Berio's Points on the Curve to Find (1975), Persichetti's Piano Concerto (1968), and other works. Anthony served as the Director of the Summer Piano Institute, Colby College and later West Chester University.

In 1991, he performed the Netherlands premiere of Witold Lutosławski's Piano Concerto with the composer conducting, followed by performances also conducted by Lutosławski with the Boston Symphony, Polish National Radio Symphony and San Francisco Symphony in 1993, on the occasion of the composer's 80th birthday.

=== Legacy ===
He made a number of recordings. His recording of Claude Debussy's Études has been described by The Boston Globe as "one of the wonders of the world". Other recordings include 14 of Scarlatti's Keyboard Sonatas, and Rachmaninoff's Preludes, Op. 32.

Among his notable pupils were Horia Mihail, Aidas Puodziukas and his protégé Konstantinos Papadakis.

== Personal life ==
In 1953, he married Sara Roosevelt Whitney (1932-2021), daughter of Betsey Cushing Roosevelt Whitney and James Roosevelt II (1907–1991), the eldest son of President of the United States, Franklin Delano Roosevelt and First Lady Anna Eleanor Roosevelt. Before their divorce in 1972, they had five children together:

- Anthony Peter Christopher Di Bonaventura (b. 1954),
- Andrea Isabella Di Bonaventura (b. 1956),
- Peter John Di Bonaventura (b. 1957)
- Sarina Rosaria Di Bonaventura (b. 1959)
- Betsy Maria Di Bonaventura (b. 1963).

Di Bonaventura died on November 12, 2012, in Boston, Massachusetts, aged 83, and was predeceased by his second wife Muriel Applebee di Bonaventura. His brother was symphony conductor Mario di Bonaventura, and his nephew is film producer Lorenzo di Bonaventura.
