= Mary Benedict Cushing =

American socialite, philanthropist and art collector. (1906–1978)

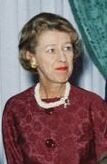
- Cushing at the White House in 1961
- Born: January 27, 1906
- Died: November 4, 1978 (aged 72)
- Spouses: William Vincent Astor (m. 1940; div. 1953) James Whitney Fosburgh (m. 1953; died 1978)
- Parent(s): Harvey Williams Cushing; Katharine Stone Crowell
- Relatives: Betsey Cushing (sister); Barbara Cushing (sister)

Mary Benedict Cushing Astor Fosburgh (January 27, 1906 – November 4, 1978) was an American socialite, philanthropist and art collector.

== Early life ==
Mary Benedict Cushing was the eldest daughter of Harvey Williams Cushing (1869–1939) and his wife Katharine Stone Crowell. Her father, a pioneering neurosurgeon, was the first person to describe Cushing's disease, and, along with Ernest Sachs, is known as the "father of neurosurgery."

Her two sisters, also prominent socialites – the Cushing Sisters were renowned in their time – were Betsey Maria Cushing (1908–1998), who was married to James Roosevelt II and later to John Hay Whitney, and Barbara Cushing (1915–1978), who married Stanley Grafton Mortimer, Jr. and later William S. Paley. She also had two brothers, William Harvey Cushing and Henry Kirke Cushing.

== Philanthropy ==
Cushing was a trustee of the Metropolitan Museum of Art and the New York City Center, and was on the board of the Yale Art Gallery. She was also a major supporter of the American National Theater and Academy and the Henry Street Settlement. During World War II, she was a leader in the Ship Service Committee and New York City War Fund.

== Personal life ==
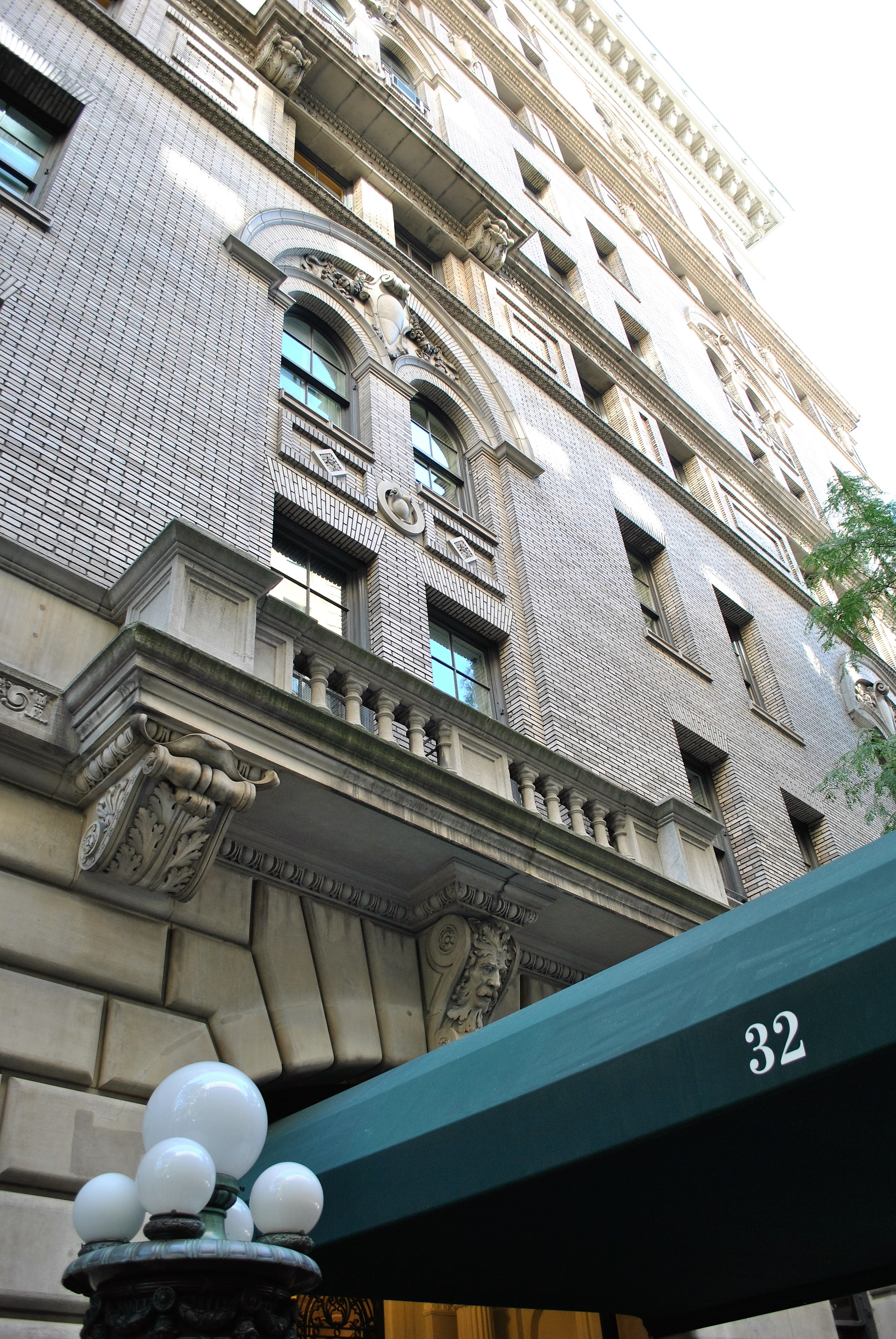
Cushing lived at 32 East 64th Street in Manhattan

In 1940, she married for the first time to William Vincent Astor (1891–1959), son of Colonel John Jacob Astor IV and Ava Lowle Willing. It was Astor's second marriage, his first to Helen Dinsmore Huntington, ended in divorce, also in 1940. They were divorced in 1953.

Later in 1953, she married her second husband, the painter James Whitney Fosburgh (1910–1978). Together, they amassed a significant art collection known for its paintings, including works by Paul Cézanne, Winslow Homer, William Nicholson, Pierre-Auguste Renoir, Walter Sickert, and Pavel Tchelitchew.

Cushing died on November 4, 1978, nearly 4 months after her youngest sister Babe died.
