= Betsey Cushing Whitney =

American philanthropist (1908–1998)

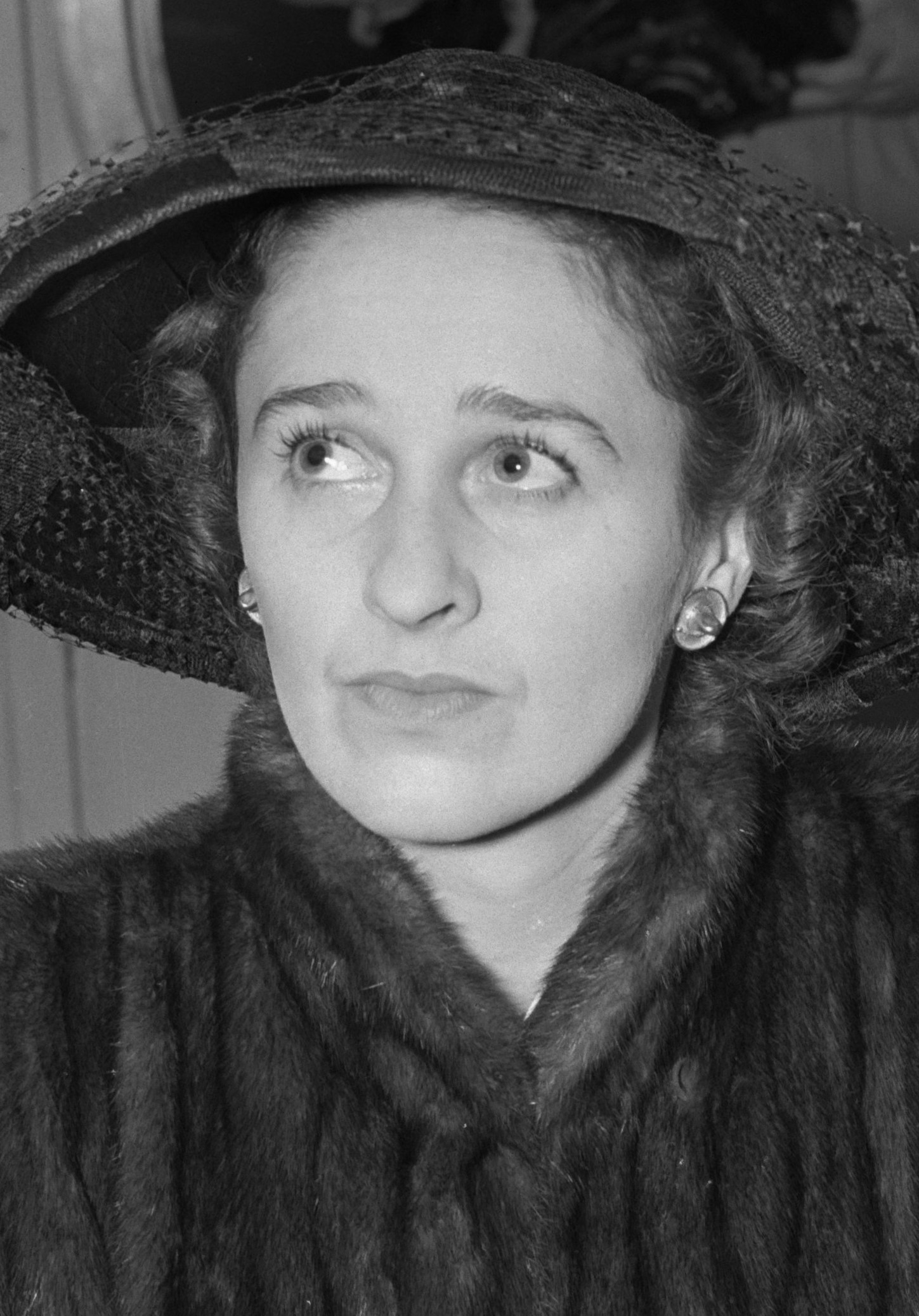
- Whitney in 1940
- Born: Betsey Maria Cushing; May 18, 1908; Baltimore, Maryland, U.S.
- Died: March 25, 1998 (aged 89); Manhasset, New York, U.S.
- Spouses: James Roosevelt II (m. 1930; div. 1940) John Hay Whitney (m. 1942; died 1982)
- Children: Sara Delano Roosevelt; Kate Roosevelt
- Parent(s): Harvey Williams Cushing; Katharine Stone Crowell
- Relatives: Mary Benedict Cushing (sister); Barbara Cushing (sister)

Betsey Maria Whitney (née Cushing, formerly Roosevelt; May 18, 1908 – March 25, 1998) was an American philanthropist, a former daughter-in-law of President Franklin D. Roosevelt, and later wife of U.S. Ambassador to the Court of St James's, John Hay Whitney.

== Early life ==
She was the middle daughter of prominent neurosurgeon Harvey Williams Cushing and his wife, Katharine Stone Crowell, who hailed from a socially prominent Cleveland family. Dr. Cushing, who was descended from Matthew Cushing, an early settler of Hingham, Massachusetts, served as professor of surgery at Johns Hopkins, Harvard and Yale universities, and established the family in Boston.

Though she had two brothers, she and her two sisters became known in the social world as the "Cushing Sisters", heralded for their charm and beauty and schooled by their social-climbing mother to pursue husbands of wealth and prominence. All three Cushing sisters married into wealth and prominence: Her older sister, Mary "Minnie", married Vincent Astor, the heir to a $200 million fortune, in 1940, and her younger sister Barbara "Babe" was married to Standard Oil heir Stanley Mortimer Jr., and later to CBS founder William S. Paley. Both of her sisters died of cancer within months of each other in 1978.

== Philanthropy ==
She established the Greentree Foundation in 1983 to assist local community groups. She was a benefactor of North Shore University Hospital in Manhasset, built in the early 1950s on 15 acres (61,000 m^{2}) donated by Whitney. She was also involved with the Museum of Modern Art (MOMA), Yale University and New York Hospital-Cornell Medical Center. Among her many public activities over the years were memberships on the boards of the Whitney Museum of American Art, the John Hay Whitney Foundation and the Association for Homemakers Service.

After her husband's death in 1982, she donated $8 million to the Yale Medical School, then the largest gift in the school's history. The National Gallery of Art in Washington, D.C. acquired nine important American and French paintings, as well as $2 million for future acquisitions. She left $15 million to New York Hospital-Cornell Medical Center in her own will.

She also made art auction history in 1990 by putting up for sale, by Sotheby's, one of Renoir's most famous paintings, the sun-dappled cafe scene Bal au moulin de la Galette, Montmartre. It brought $78.1 million, then a record auction price for Impressionist art and the second-highest price for any artwork sold at auction. After her death, her art collection was sold at Sotheby's in 1999 for a then-record $128.3 million, "the second-highest single-owner auction in history."

== Personal life ==
In June 1930, she married James Roosevelt II (1907–1991), the eldest son of then Governor of New York, and eventual President of the United States, Franklin Delano Roosevelt and Anna Eleanor Roosevelt. After her father-in-law became president, her husband served his father as an aide at the White House, and she often stood-in as hostess at the White House when Eleanor was absent. When FDR entertained King George VI and Queen Elizabeth at a picnic at the Roosevelt estate in Hyde Park, New York in 1939, she was present and accompanied FDR as he drove the King and Queen along the Hudson River.

She and James had two daughters:

- Sara Delano Roosevelt (March 13, 1932 – October 22, 2021), who married Anthony di Bonaventura (1929–2012) in 1953. They divorced in 1972 and she married Ronald A. Wilford (1927–2015) in 1973.
- Kate Roosevelt (1936–2002), later known as Kate Whitney after her stepfather adopted her. She is the mother of Lulie Haddad.

In 1938, James left for Hollywood to work as an aide to Samuel Goldwyn. Betsey followed him, but they divorced in 1940. She was granted custody of their daughters, along with child support, though by biographers' accounts, James had little to no contact with his children, and eventually married three more times.

On March 1, 1942, she married millionaire John Hay "Jock" Whitney (1904–1982), who had been previously married to socialite Elizabeth Altemus. Whitney adopted both of her daughters. They moved to London in 1957, when President Dwight D. Eisenhower named Whitney Ambassador to the Court of St. James's.

During the 1970s, Whitney was listed as one of the ten wealthiest men in the world. Their residences over the years included the Greentree estate on Long Island; Greenwood Plantation in Georgia; a town house and an elegant apartment in Manhattan; a large summer house on Fishers Island, near New London, Connecticut; a 12-room house in Saratoga Springs, which the Whitneys used when they attended horse races there; a golfing cottage in Augusta, Georgia; and a spacious house, Cherry Hill, in Virginia Water, Surrey, England, near the Ascot racecourse. In addition, the Whitneys shared a Kentucky horse farm with Whitney's sister, Joan Whitney Payson.

=== Death ===
She died on March 25, 1998, at North Shore University Hospital in Manhasset, New York. Her personal fortune was estimated at $700 million in 1990 according to Forbes magazine. Her estate bequeathed eight major paintings to the National Gallery of Art.

== Art owned ==
- Self-Portrait (1889) by Vincent van Gogh
- Marcelle Lender Dancing the Bolero in Chilpéric (1895/1896) by Henri de Toulouse-Lautrec
- Open Window, Collioure (1905) by Henri Matisse
- The Harbor of La Ciotat (1907) by Georges Braque
- The Beach at Sainte-Adresse (1906) by Raoul Dufy
- Bal du moulin de la Galette (1876) by Pierre-Auguste Renoir, the fifth most expensive painting ever sold, when adjusted for inflation.
