= Sara Wilford =

American psychologist (1932–2021)

- Born: Sara Delano Roosevelt; March 13, 1932; Boston, Massachusetts, U.S.
- Died: October 22, 2021 (aged 89)
- Occupation: Psychologist
- Spouses: Anthony di Bonaventura (m. 1953; div. 1972) Ronald A. Wilford (m. 1973; died 2015)
- Children: 5
- Parents: James Roosevelt II; Betsey Cushing Roosevelt Whitney; Jock Whitney (adoptive father)

Sara Delano Wilford (née Roosevelt, later Whitney, then di Bonaventura; March 13, 1932 – October 22, 2021) was an American psychologist, and educator. She taught at Sarah Lawrence College from 1982 to 2014.

== Early life ==
Sara Delano Roosevelt was a daughter of Betsey Cushing Roosevelt Whitney, a philanthropist in medicine and art, and businessman James Roosevelt, the oldest son of U.S. president Franklin D. Roosevelt and first lady Eleanor Roosevelt. Wilford's adoptive father was John Hay Whitney.

== Career ==
Wilford earned an M.S.Ed from Bank Street College of Education. She taught at Sarah Lawrence College from 1982 to 2014, where she was the director of the Art of Teaching graduate program in early childhood and childhood education from 1985 through 2014. Additionally, she was director of the college's Early Childhood Center for 21 years (1982–2003). The center, which was established in 1937 as a “laboratory school,” allows graduate and undergraduate students enrolled in child development and education courses to both study children ages 2–6 and to directly assist in their education. During her tenure, the Early Childhood Center added a class for 5- to 6-year-olds, and broadened financial aid available to the center's students’ families.

Wilford taught courses connecting child development principles to educational practice. She was a workshop leader for seminars and conferences on early childhood education and literacy development, and a member of Editorial Advisory Board for Child Magazine. She is the author of the critically lauded Tough Topics: How to Use Books in Talking with Children About Life Issues and Problems and What you Need to Know When Your Child is Learning to Read.

Interest in early childhood education worldwide led her to the Schools of Reggio Emilia, Italy in 1993, and to the U.S./South Africa Joint Conference on Early Childhood Education in 1996. She has presented in a seminar sponsored by the Department of Early Childhood Education at the University of Athens, Greece, and took part in a literacy delegation to New Zealand and Australia in the summer of 2000.

Wilford is featured in the Learning Child Series videos which were produced for public television under the guidance of experts from the Child Development Institute at Sarah Lawrence College. The Learning Child Series, designed to assist parents and educators in guiding children to become motivated and thoughtful learners, is about nurturing the whole child, recognizing that each child is unique and that every child's needs are different.

Wilford received an Outstanding Service Award from Westchester Community College in 1999. In 2009, she received a Champions for Children Leader of the Year Award, presented by the New York State Association for the Education of Young Children.

== Personal life ==
Wilford was married to Ronald A. Wilford from 1973 to his death in 2015. She was previously married to the classical pianist Anthony di Bonaventura, a son of Italian born barber Fred di Bonaventura. Before their divorce in 1972, they had five children together.

She died on October 22, 2021.

== Selected works ==
- Wilford, Sara (1997). What You Need to Know When Your Child Is Learning to Read. Scholastic. ISBN 978-0-590-03291-9.
- Wilford, Sara (2009). Nurturing Young Children's Disposition to Learn. Redleaf Press. ISBN 978-1-933653-47-1.
