= Ronald A. Wilford =

American talent manager

Ronald A. Wilford (November 4, 1927, in Salt Lake City – June 13, 2015, in New York City) was an American music manager who has been described as “classical music's biggest power broker”. He spent 50 years at Columbia Artists Management, Inc. (CAMI), his clients included conductors James Levine, Seiji Ozawa, Mstislav Rostropovich, Herbert von Karajan, Claudio Abbado, Kurt Masur, Sir Colin Davis, Riccardo Muti, pianists Maurizio Pollini and Vladimir Horowitz as well as vocalists Kathleen Battle and Marilyn Horne, among many others.

== Biography ==
Wilford described his childhood in Salt Lake City as miserable where he lived with his Greek Orthodox father and member of The Church of Jesus Christ of Latter-day Saints mother. At the time of his death, he was married to Sara Wilford. Wilford is a graduate of the University of Utah.

== Career ==
Credited with bringing Marcel Marceau to the United States when Wilford was starting his career, he was hired by Columbia Artists to begin a theatrical division. He became president in 1970 and stepped down in 2000, taking on the titles of chairman and CEO until his death.
