= Konstantinos Papadakis (pianist) =

Konstantinos Papadakis (Greek: Κωνσταντίνος Παπαδάκης; born October 2, 1972, in Heraklion, Crete, Greece) is a Greek pianist. He has received the Golden Medal of superior talent. He has performed in worldwide major concert halls such as Carnegie Hall and Wigmore Hall. He studied with Anthony di Bonaventura at Boston University. Three years later, he joined the piano faculty at Boston University and was later appointed a "Samuel Barber" Artist in Residence at West Chester University of Pennsylvania where he remained for five years. In 2011 he joined the piano faculty of the New England Conservatory's Pre-College Division in Boston. He holds the prestigious Motoko and Gordon Deane Principal Chair of Boston's Atlantic Symphony Orchestra. He has premiered many works, including Samuel Barber's "Three Essays", "Three Sketches", "Fresh from West Chester" and "Fantasy for two pianos". The Boston Globe has described him as "one of the greatest hopes of music". Celebrating the bicentennial year of Franz Liszt, he released a recording with short miniatures for piano entitled "The Short Liszt" to a critical acclaim. He is the director of the Athens Piano Academy in Athens, Greece. In 2013 was appointed lecturer at Boston University College of Fine Arts.

== Achievements ==
- 1996 Rachmaninoff Piano Competition in Moscow
- 2000 Barber Foundation Achievement Award
- First pianist to receive the Yannis Vardinoyannis Award
- Esther & Albert Kahn Award.
