= James Whitney Fosburgh =

American painter, art collector, and art historian

James W. Fosburgh
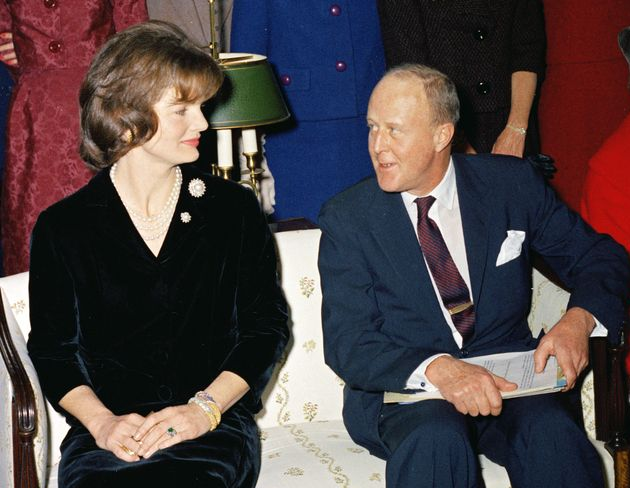
- Whitney with First Lady Jacqueline Kennedy at the White House, 1961
- Born: James Whitney Fosburgh; August 1, 1910; New York, US
- Died: April 23, 1978 (aged 67); New York, US
- Education: Yale University
- Spouse: Mary Benedict Cushing (m. 1953)

James Whitney Fosburgh (August 1, 1910 – April 23, 1978) was an American painter, art collector, and art historian. In addition to lecturing and writing about art, he served as Chairman of the Special Committee for White House Paintings under both President John F. Kennedy and President Lyndon B. Johnson. Fosburgh and his wife, Mary ("Minnie") Cushing, were prominent art collectors in New York City.

== Early life ==
James Whitney Fosburgh was born in New York on August 1, 1910. He was the son of James Boies Alleyne Fosburgh (1879–1926) and Leila Whitney (d. 1913). After his mother's death in 1913, his father married his mother's younger sister, Eleanor Newton Whitney (1887–1930). His father, who was from Buffalo, New York, was also a Yale graduate.

He graduated from Yale University in 1933, and afterwards completed a Master's thesis on the journals of Thomas Sully, receiving his M.A. from Yale University in 1935. In 1955, he joined the governing board of the Yale Art Gallery, later the Yale University Art Gallery.

== Career ==
During World War II, Fosburgh enlisted as a glider pilot and served with the 101st Airborne Division.

He later returned to New York and worked at The Frick Collection, first as a docent, from October 1935-June 1938, and later as lecturer, from October 1947-May 1954. During this time, he began to exhibit his artwork throughout the city. In the 1950s and 1960s, he participated in group and solo shows at Durlacher Bros. Gallery, Kennedy Galleries, and Coe Kerr Galleries.

=== White House ===
Throughout the Kennedy administration, First Lady Jacqueline Kennedy endeavored to restore the interiors of the White House and bring historical character to the space. Soon after her husband took office, Kennedy formed the Fine Arts Committee for the White House, naming Henry F. du Pont Chairman and serving herself as Honorary Chairman.

In November 1961, Jacqueline Kennedy and Henry F. du Pont established a Special Committee for White House Paintings, part of the Fine Arts Committee for the White House, and appointed Fosburgh head of the new group. Until that point, the expertise and interests of Fine Arts Committee members had been largely focused on antique furnishings, not pictures. Fosburgh's Committee was charged with expanding the White House collection of paintings, including portraits, landscapes, and still lifes, and replacing "certain non-historic paintings of past Presidents with those which were actually painted from life." Within two years, the Special Committee had acquired over 150 new works for the collection.

Kennedy retained for her own collection, Fosburgh's posthumous portrait of John F. Kennedy, which was featured on the November 5, 1965 cover of LIFE Magazine. Other works by Fosburgh are in the collections of the Metropolitan Museum of Art, the Pennsylvania Academy of the Fine Arts, and The Frick Collection.

== Personal life ==
In 1953, Fosburgh married Mary ("Minnie") Cushing (1906–1978), one of the Cushing sisters, who had recently divorced Vincent Astor after thirteen years of marriage. Together, Fosburgh and Mary Cushing developed a significant collection of art, primarily comprising American and European paintings from the 18th and 19th centuries.
