= Cushing sisters =

Three 20th-century American socialites

The Cushing Sisters were three 20th-century American socialites. They were the daughters of neurosurgeon Harvey Williams Cushing and Katharine Stone Crowell:

- Minnie Benedict Cushing (1906–1978), philanthropist and art collector.
- Betsey Cushing (1908–1998), philanthropist.
- Barbara 'Babe' Cushing (1915–1978), fashion editor and style celebrity.

The Cushing Sisters were raised by a mother who saw "marriage as a form of female self-expression", and always sought to achieve success through exceptional husbands. None of them attended college.

In 2000, Lifetime had started producing a movie about the sisters with Rita Wilson as executive producer. Lifetime saw it as "a sweeping piece. Their story covers the '40s, '50s and '60s in New York."

The three daughters of Robert Warren Miller (Pia Getty, Marie-Chantal, Crown Princess of Greece, Alexandra von Fürstenberg) were compared to the Cushing sisters by Vanity Fair.
