= History of Wesleyan University =

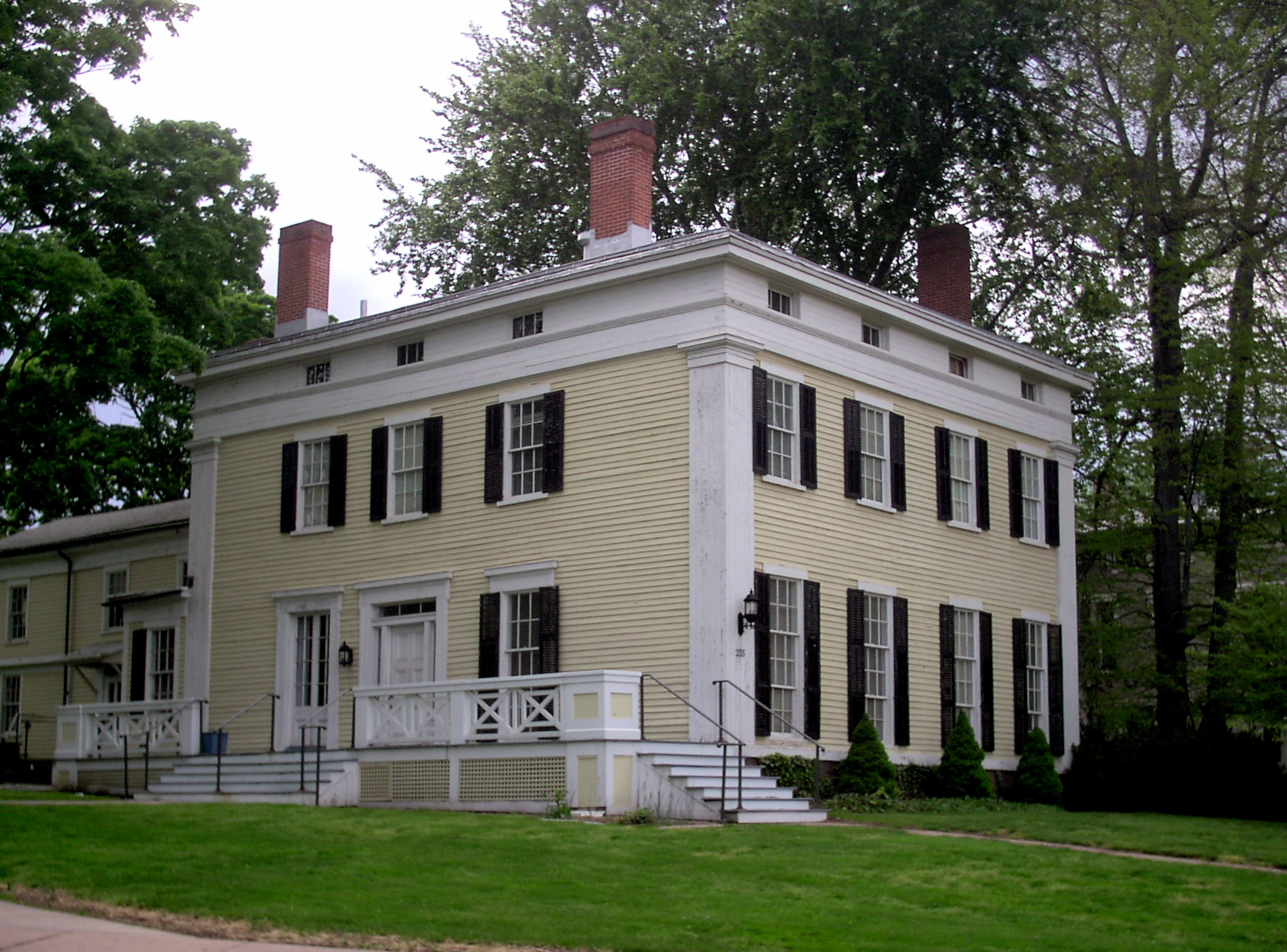
The President's House, erected in 1837–38 for Wilbur Fisk; it served as a home for the presidents of Wesleyan until 1904.

Wesleyan University is a private liberal arts college and "little university" located in Middletown, Connecticut. The now secular and co-ed institution was founded in 1831 as an all-male Methodist college.

Historian David B. Potts divides the history of Wesleyan into four periods. According to Potts, from its founding until 1870, Wesleyan was a "local evangelical enterprise", an amalgam of local financing and Methodist sponsorship. From 1870 to 1910, it was a "decidedly Methodist" institution. It evolved away from its specifically Methodist character and from 1910 to 1962 was one of many prestigious New England liberal arts colleges. (Ties to Methodism were formally broken in 1937.) Since 1962, capitalizing on the success of its endowment in the prior decade, it began a transformation into a "little university".

== Founding ==
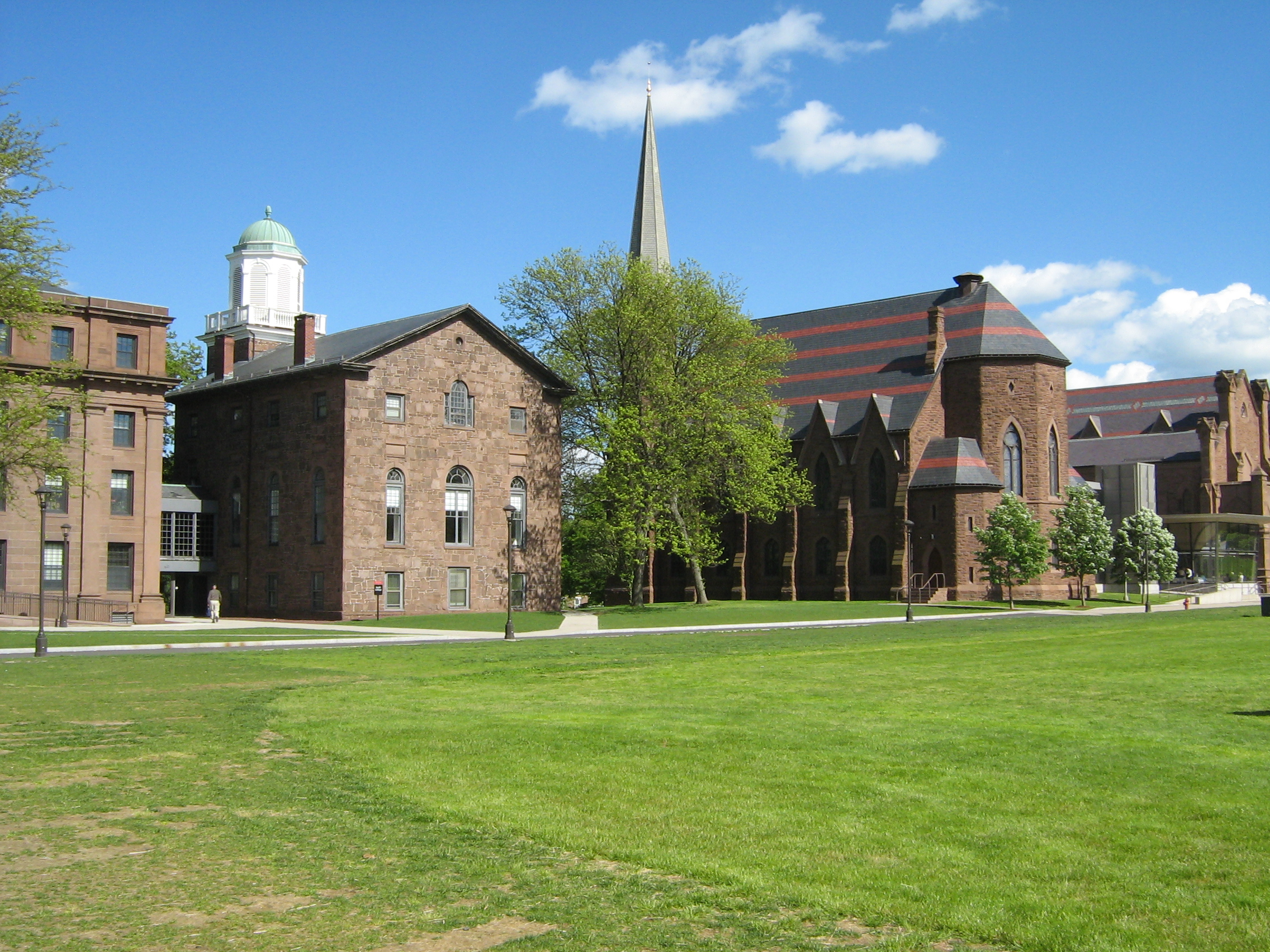
College Row. From left to right: North College, South College, Memorial Chapel, Patricelli '92 Theater (Not pictured: Judd Hall)

Wesleyan was founded by Methodist leaders and prominent residents of Middletown, and was the first academic institution to be named after John Wesley, the Protestant theologian who was the founder of Methodism. Although sponsored by the Methodist conference, under the leadership of the first president Wilbur Fisk (also written as Willbur Fisk) the college did not have a denominational requirement for admission and in addition to seminarian studies it had an innovative curriculum including electives and modern languages. Fisk also traveled to Europe during his presidency to purchase books and scientific equipment, including one of the first telescopes at a college or university, which is currently conserved at Wesleyan's Van Vleck Observatory. Wesleyan remained a leader in educational progress throughout its history, and erected the first building dedicated to the sciences on any American college campus, Judd Hall. It also has always maintained a much larger library collection than a comparable institution its size.

The campus predates the college. Several prominent citizens of Middletown sought to have a college on High Street, and by subscription raised the funds to build two buildings, today's South College, and the original North College, a Nassau Hall-type building. The first occupant of the buildings was Captain Alden Partridge's American Literary, Scientific, & Military Academy in 1825. That institution had a checkered career and became a center of controversy. In 1829, the military academy moved back to Norwich, Vermont when the Connecticut legislature declined to charter it to grant college degrees, and it later became Norwich University. Afterward, the Methodist Church agreed to buy the vacant campus, then consisting of five buildings, North College, South College, a dormitory that extended across the current campus to High Street, Webb Hall and President's House, (now the Latin American Studies Center).

In the 1840s, Wesleyan was already beginning to make a reputation for itself both for the abolitionist sentiments of its students, and with their ongoing association with the Transcendentalist movement. Both Ralph Waldo Emerson and Orestes Brownson were brought to the campus by the student literary societies, especially the Mystical 7. As national affairs moved closer to war, Wesleyan was put in a more awkward position than many other New England colleges; the Methodist Church was very strong in the South, and a significant number of students were from Southern states. These links were severed after 1861. Not every alumnus who served in the Civil War fought for the Union.

== The "decidedly Methodist" era ==
In 1872, the university became one of the first U.S. colleges to experiment with coeducation by allowing a small number of female students to attend, a venture then known as the "Wesleyan Experiment". Because of the preponderance of female students preparing for college in that period, some of Wesleyan's alumni believed that opening the door to coeducation would eventually result in the student body becoming entirely female. Given that concern, Wesleyan ceased to admit women, and from 1912 to 1970 Wesleyan operated again as an all-male college. Wesleyan's decision to stop admitting women subsequently helped lead to the establishment of all-female Connecticut College in nearby New London, founded by Wesleyan alumnae in 1911.

In the days before the invention of the forward pass, Wesleyan was a leader in the development of football as a college sport. For a little more than a decade, Wesleyan fielded teams that played against Yale, Michigan, and Harvard. However these much larger schools eventually were able to far outstrip Wesleyan, and one game, where Wesleyan lost 136 to 0 to Yale (still a record loss in the Northeast), proved that Wesleyan could no longer compete at that level. However, in their only meeting in history in 1883, Wesleyan beat Michigan 14–6.

As detailed by David Potts in his history of Wesleyan, the last decades of the nineteenth century were crucial for Wesleyan. In 1875, Cyrus Foss was able to restore short-term financial stability to the school with many donors from the Methodist Church. To do this, he implemented Christianizing disciplinary measures over the school to combat the "Godlessness" of state-run universities. These policies lasted only two years, and this donorship lasted only a couple of years after that. Afterward, Wesleyan developed the patronage of several prominent families in New York City, (Harriman, Andrus, and to a lesser extent, Vanderbilt), and the institutional ties to those groups markedly increased, while that of the Methodist Church decreased. At the same time, Wesleyan went from being a colorful but minor sectarian educational center to being a well-connected New England college.

Two of the leading faculty members of the period were William North Rice and Caleb T. Winchester. Rice was hired after his graduation in 1865 as the university librarian, and later became a professor of mathematics and geology. In his 51 years on the faculty, he also taught every other subject as needed on an interim basis. His greatest professional success was in his contributions toward completing the first geological survey of Connecticut. He was also named an acting president of the university between two administrations. Some of his carefully hand-written library cards were still in use in the library card catalog until it was retired in the 1990s. Caleb T. Winchester was a professor of English literature who began his 50-year career at Wesleyan a year after Rice's. His senior year seminar on 'The English Essayists' won him national attention, and Sir Walter A. Raleigh wryly remarked after his tour of America that Winchester was the only educated American he had met.

Another prominent faculty member was Wilbur Olin Atwater, professor of chemistry and director of the Connecticut Agricultural Experiment Station (1875–1877) and the Storrs Agricultural Experiment Station (1888–1902). Atwater conducted pioneering tests in human metabolism in the new campus laboratory, the John Bell Scott Memorial, and his work shows the heightened presence of the sciences at Wesleyan in this period compared to some of its peer institutions.

There was a minor building boom on campus in the years just after the turn of the century, which included Fayerweather Gymnasium, (1898), Fisk Hall, (1903), the John Bell Scott Memorial, (1904), Alpha Delta Phi, (1906), Eclectic, (1907). The Van Vleck Observatory, Clark Hall, and the Tomb of the Skull & Serpent Society were designed at this time by the architect Henry Bacon, as was the Hall of the Eclectic Society. Later, starting in the mid-1920s, the Johnstone Quadrangle was created, including Olin Memorial Library, Harriman Hall, Shanklin Hall, and the Hall Chemistry Laboratories. This series of buildings was all designed by the well-known firm of McKim, Mead & White. The completion of these two episodes of building finished the core of the campus and gave Wesleyan its basic layout through to today (although Shanklin Hall is currently threatened with demolition).

From the 1890s until World War II, Wesleyan men formed various singing groups, including a full men's chorus. There were various tours of singing groups through the early days of radio and especially in the 1920s. At that time, Wesleyan billed itself as "The Singing University."

Woodrow Wilson taught history and political economy at Wesleyan from 1888 to 1890. Before Wesleyan, Wilson taught at Bryn Mawr, where he felt "overworked, underpaid, and much less than enthusiastic about the higher education of women". At Wesleyan, Wilson published, The State, a study of comparative government. This work won him tenure at the university.

In 1909, then U.S. President William Howard Taft and U.S. Vice President James S. Sherman were two of the principal speakers (along with the president of the Wesleyan student body, Arthur T. Vanderbilt, and U.S. Senator and future Nobel Laureate Elihu Root) at the inauguration of William Arnold Shanklin as the ninth president of Wesleyan.

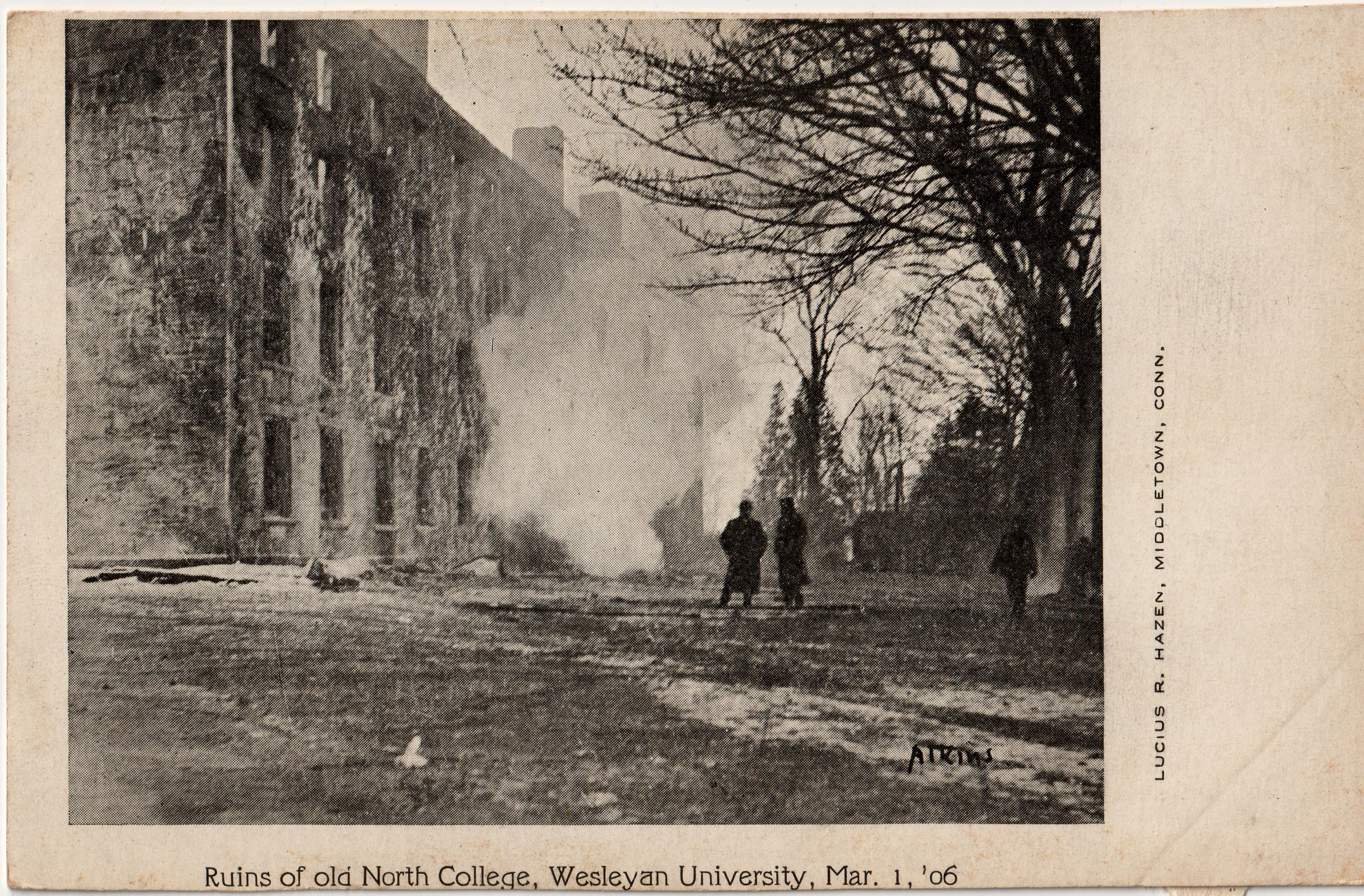
Ruins of old North College, Wesleyan University after a fire in 1906

== List of Wesleyan Presidents ==
Presidents of Wesleyan University.
No.	Name	President	Term	Profession	Lifetime	Buried
1.	Rev. Willbur Fisk	President	1831–1839	Minister	1792–1839	Campus cemetery
	Augustus William Smith	Acting	1835–1836	Mathematician	1802–1866	Annapolis, Maryland
	Augustus William Smith	Acting	1839–1841	Mathematician	1802–1866	Annapolis, Maryland
2.	Rev. Stephen Olin	President	1839–1841	Minister	1797–1851	?
3.	Rev. Nathan Bangs	President	1841–1842	Minister	1778–1862	?
2.	Rev. Stephen Olin	President	1842–1851	Minister	1797–1851	?
	John Johnston	Acting	1851–1852	Mathematician	1806–1872	?
4.	Augustus William Smith	President	1852–1857	Mathematician	1802–1866	Annapolis, Maryland
	John Johnston	Acting	1857–1857	Mathematician	1806–1872	?
5.	Joseph Cummings	President	1858–1875	Minister	1817–1890	Indian Hill cemetery
	John Monroe Van Vleck	Acting	1872–1873	Astronomer	1833–1912	Indian Hill cemetery
6.	Rev. Cyrus David Foss	President	1875–1880	Bishop	1834–1910	Pawling, New York
7.	Rev. John Wesley Beach	President	1880–1887	Minister	1825–1902	Indian Hill cemetery
	John Monroe Van Vleck	Acting	1887–1889	Astronomer	1833–1912	Indian Hill cemetery
8.	Bradford Paul Raymond	President	1889–1908	Theologian	1846–1916	Indian Hill cemetery
	John Monroe Van Vleck	Acting	1896–1897	Astronomer	1833–1912	Indian Hill cemetery
	William North Rice	Acting	1908–1909	Geologist	1845–1928	Indian Hill cemetery
9.	Rev. William Arnold Shanklin	President	1909–1923	Minister	1862–1924	?
	Stephen Henry Olin	Acting	1923–1925	Symposiast	1847–1925	College Cemetery
10.	James Lukens McConaughy	President	1925–1943	Governor of Connecticut	1887–1948	Indian Hill cemetery
11.	Victor Lloyd Butterfield	President	1943–1967	Philosopher	1904–1975	Wildwood Cemetery
12.	Edwin Deacon Etherington	President	1967–1970	President, NYSE	1924–2001	?
	Robert A. Rosenbaum	Acting	1970–1970	Mathematician	1915 –	
13.	Colin Goetze Campbell	President	1970–1988	Vice-president, NYSE	1935 –	
	William J. Barber	Acting	1988–1988	Economist	1925 –	
14.	William Chace	President	1988–1994	Dean, Stanford University	1938 –	
	Joanne V. Creighton	Acting	1994–1995	Educator	1942 –	
15.	Douglas J. Bennet, Jr.	President	1995–2007	President, NPR	1938–2018	
16.	Michael S. Roth	President	2007–present	Historian	1957 –	

== The secular era ==
Wesleyan severed its ties with the Methodist Church in 1937. In a further move towards a secular positioning of its academic focus, the administration ceased to define the curriculum as Christian in the 1960s, and also eliminated compulsory chapel at the same time. Today, many regard Wesleyan as a haven for counter-culture intellectuals, social progressives, and political activists.

During World War II, as college-aged men volunteered or were drafted to fight overseas, Wesleyan's enrollment was supplemented by the presence on campus of both the U.S. Navy V-12 officer training program and the U.S. Naval V-5 Flight Preparatory School, which allowed the university to remain open.

In the mid-1950s, Wesleyan, under the presidency of Victor Lloyd Butterfield, began an ambitious program to reorganize itself into seven residential colleges. Three buildings were built as one complex west of the campus, and three more as a complex to the south of the campus. The programs were never fully developed, but the buildings of the residential colleges still serve as the Foss Hill and Butterfield dormitories. Two colleges still remain as academic programs: the College of Letters (COL) and the College of Social Studies (CSS); although they are not true colleges and do not have residential facilities or resident scholars. Nevertheless, both are considered exceptionally intensive study programs and are considered excellent preparation for later graduate work. Fund raising proved highly effective and by 1960 Wesleyan had the largest endowment, per student, of any college or university in America, and a student-faculty ratio of 7:1.

In 1956 Wesleyan attempted to acquire much of the property of Long Lane School, the state juvenile correctional facility, to expand its campus. By 1957 the university canceled the deal as the cost to acquire the land would be too great; instead the university acquired other property.

The composer John Cage was affiliated with Wesleyan from the 1950s until his death in 1993. Cage collaborated with members of the Wesleyan music faculty, composed and performed on campus, and was a fellow at the Center for Advanced Study in 1960–61 and 1969–70. Several of his books were published by the Wesleyan University Press.

On June 7, 1964, The Reverend Martin Luther King Jr. spoke at the baccalaureate service from Denison Terrace and received an honorary degree of Doctor of Divinity. King spoke at the university on four other occasions at campus rallies, church services, and colloquia. A number of Wesleyan faculty, staff, and students were active with Dr. King in the civil rights movement.

The student body became prominent in the political and counter-culture movement of the 1960s and '70s. In the tumultuous spring of 1970, which saw the Bobby Seale murder case in nearby New Haven, Connecticut and the killings at Kent State, Wesleyan undergraduates played a central role in organizing a nationwide boycott of classes. The college was closed down early for the summer as many students canvassed the community to protest racism and the Vietnam War, but not before the Grateful Dead played a free open-air concert in the middle of Andrus Field (on May 3, 1970.){fact}

Wesleyan was one of the first highly selective schools to actively recruit black and other minority students, and in the class entering in 1965 had the first substantial group of minority students, 14 young men—13 Black and one Latino. In ensuing years, much press attention was directed to race relations at Wesleyan, leading to a much publicized 1968 article in the New York Times Magazine entitled "Two Nations at Wesleyan" which used a photo of a round table at which 8 black students were seated to argue that blacks and whites did not eat together or interact otherwise. Students responded that the article ignored the photo of an adjacent table at which four black and four white students were seated.

In the 1990s Wesleyan chose to pay $15 million to purchase the Long Lane campus to avoid having a facility with an obvious prison appearance on the boundary of the university, as the state was planning to erect a security fence; area residents disliked the perception of favoritism towards the university.

Wesleyan owns a publishing concern, Wesleyan University Press. For several decades a division of the Press, American Educational Publications, produced a series called My Weekly Reader which was a subscription service to elementary schools used across the country. It was sold in 1965 to Xerox Corporation for 400,000 shares of Xerox stock worth $56 million. The sale of AEP helped to finance Wesleyan's graduate programs and the Center for Advanced Study (now the Center for the Humanities). The sale of AEP marked Wesleyan's entry into the stock market, and the next year in 1966, Edwin Deacon Etherington, president of the American Stock Exchange, was named president of the college. Wesleyan since that time has been investing its endowment, with various degrees of success. Wesleyan's endowment more than doubled from 1995 to 2005. As of the end of fiscal year 2008, it was worth approximately $720,000,000.
