= Olin Dows =

American painter

Stephen Olin Dows
- Born: August 14, 1904; Irvington-on-Hudson, New York
- Died: June 6, 1981 (aged 76); Rhinebeck, New York
- Spouse: Carmen Vial de Señoret
- Parent(s): Tracy "Pup" Dows; Alice Olin Dows
- Relatives: Stephen Henry Olin (grandfather); Julia Lynch Olin (aunt)

Stephen Olin Dows (August 14, 1904 – June 6, 1981) was a United States Army artist who served in the European Theater of Operations during World War II.

== Early life ==
Dows was born in 1904, at Irvington-on-Hudson, New York. He was the only son of Tracy "Pup" Dows and Alice Olin Dows, a socialite and poet. He had two younger sisters, Margaret "Bargy" Dows (who married Swedish diplomat Knut Richard Thyberg) and Deborah Dows (who married, and divorced, Harvard lawyer John Lancaster Burling, son of Edward B. Burling).

His maternal grandparents were Stephen Henry Olin, the acting President of Wesleyan University, and Alice Wadsworth "Elsie" (née Barlow) Olin. His maternal aunt was author and Baháʼí Julia Lynch Olin (who married former Lieutenant Governor of New York, Lewis Stuyvesant Chanler).

He was educated and trained at Harvard's Department of Fine Arts, and Yale's Student's League (New York). He studied under Eugene F. Savage, Edward C. Taylor, and C.K. Chatterton.

== Career ==
In the course of his career Dows assisted in establishing the Treasury Department's Public Works of Art Project in 1933. He was assistant director of the Treasury Section of Fine Arts, in charge of states east of the Mississippi, and then the director of Treasury of Relief Art Projects. He was commissioned by the Section of Fine Arts of the Treasury Department to write a book on "Mural Designs". In 1941 he was again commissioned by the Section to paint a post office mural, Professions and Industries of Hyde Park, in Hyde Park, New York. He also often worked for the Office of Civilian Defense in Washington DC in charge of a project to have artist depict the various phases of work in defense plants. His eight selectees turned in 73 pictures which were shown in a Soldiers of Production exhibition at the National Gallery, Washington, D.C.

=== Army ===
Olin Dows enlisted in the U.S. Army in June 1942. Stationed at Fort Meade, MD, waiting to be sent to Officers training school, Dows gave up this opportunity to go instead to the European Theater of Operations as a war artist. He was appointed head of a group of three artists to cover the ETO. He remained in England for a year, attached to the Historical Section of the ETO. A month after his arrival in England, Congress denied the necessary appropriations and the art program was officially canceled. He was instead given photography missions, but nevertheless kept up with his painting. In England he was attached to the 166th Signal Photo Unit and went with them to Normandy late in June 1944. He covered the 35th Division after D-Day and was with them from June to September 1944. Dows saw action at Bastogne, Metz, and was with the Third Army in the final drive across Germany. He was present at the junction of American and Soviet Forces and depicted this meeting in several of his paintings.

=== Works ===
The collection of his works includes sketches of his fellow soldiers from basic training at Fort Belvoir, VA; from his trip to Great Britain, many drawings, mainly in color, of scenes of debarkation and of the life of the soldiers on the transport. These were followed by a third series of "on the spot" as well as more fully developed drawings of American soldiers training in Great Britain. He helped to organize exhibitions of the work of American artists in England. He was discharged from the Army in August 1945.

In 1949, he published Franklin Roosevelt at Hyde Park together with a collection of his drawings.

== Personal life ==
In 1950, Dows was married to Chilean diplomat Carmen Vial de Señoret, a great-granddaughter of Ramón Freire, the first President of Chile.

After a long illness, Carmen died in January 1978 at her family's farm in Puente Alto, Chile. Dows died at Glenburn, his home in Rhinebeck, New York, on June 6, 1981.
