= USS Bridge (AF-1) =

Cargo ship of the United States Navy

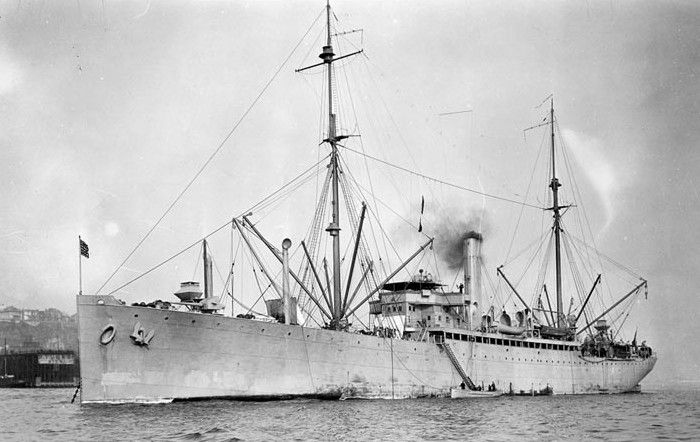
- USS Bridge (AF-1) at anchor, location unknown, 27 December 1918

History

United States
- Name: Bridge
- Namesake: Horatio Bridge
- Builder: Boston Navy Yard
- Cost: $1,253,491 (hull & machinery)
- Laid down: 12 June 1915
- Launched: 18 May 1916
- Sponsored by: Mrs. Granville Searcy Fleece
- Commissioned: 2 June 1917
- Decommissioned: 27 June 1946
- Reclassified: Provisions Stores Ship (AF), 17 July 1920
- Stricken: 1946 (est.)
- Identification: Hull symbol: AF-1 (17 July 1920); Code letters: NOI (1917-1941); Code letters: NESF (WWII)
- Honors and awards: 1 × battle star for Okinawa Gunto operation
- Fate: Sold, 22 December 1947

Philippines
- Name: Don Jose
- Acquired: 122 December 1947
- Fate: Scrapped, March 1953

General characteristics
- Class & type: Bridge-class stores ship
- Tonnage: 3,170 DWT
- Displacement: 8,500 long tons (8,600 t); 9,500 long tons (9,700 t) (1945-)
- Length: 423 ft 11 in (129.21 m)
- Beam: 55 ft 2 in (16.81 m)
- Draft: 22 ft 9 in (6.93 m)
- Installed power: 2 × White Forester boilers, 200 psi (1,400 kPa); 5,000 shp (3,700 kW)
- Propulsion: 2 × Boston Navy Yard triple expansion steam engines; 2 × propeller
- Speed: 14 kn (26 km/h; 16 mph)
- Capacity: 86,757 cu ft (2,456.7 m^{3}) (non-refrigerated); 4,300 cu ft (120 m^{3}) (refrigerated)
- Complement: 238 officers and enlisted; 21 officers (1945); 261 enlisted (1945)
- Armament: As built; 4 × 5 in (130 mm)/51 caliber guns; 1 × 3 in (76 mm)/50 caliber gun (Anti-aircraft); 1942; 2 × 5 in/51 caliber guns (aft); 1 × 3 in/50 caliber gun (AA); 1 × 1.1 in (28 mm)/75 caliber gun (forward) (AA); 8 × single mount 20 mm (0.79 in) Oerlikon cannons; 1945; 1 × twin mount 40 mm (1.6 in) Bofors gun (forward) (AA); 1 × 5 in/38 caliber gun (dual purpose) (aft); 4 × 3 in/50 caliber guns (DP)

The first USS Bridge (AF-1) was a stores ship in service with the United States Navy from 1917 to 1946. Following a short commercial service, she was scrapped in 1953. She was named for Horatio Bridge, the Chief of the Bureau of Provisions and Clothing, from 1854 to 1868.

== Construction ==
Bridge was laid down at the Boston Navy Yard, in Boston, Massachusetts, on 12 June 1915. She was launched on 18 May 1916; sponsored by Mrs. Granville Searcy Fleece, a grandniece of the ships namesake, Horatio Bridge; and commissioned on 2 June 1917.

== Service history ==
=== World War I ===
Following her commissioning, Bridge loaded stores and provisions, and transported and issued them, to US Navy fleet and shore stations.

During 1917–1918, she made four round trips across the Atlantic, as a unit of the Naval Overseas Transportation Service. On 1 July 1918, while at New York City, Bridge was assigned to the Train, United States Atlantic Fleet, and operated between New York City, the York River, and the Chesapeake Bay.

On 1 October 1917, she came to the assistance of the patrol vessel USRC Mohawk, which had collided with the British tanker Vennacher off Sandy Hook, New Jersey. After the patrol vessels Mohican and Sabalo took off all 77 members of Mohawk's crew, Bridge attempted to tow Mohawk to shallow water, but before she could generate any forward movement, Mohawk sank rapidly in 100 ft (30 m) of water, forcing Bridge to cut the tow line and go full speed ahead on both engines to get clear of the sinking Mohawk.

=== Inter-war period ===
By 1920, the first system of numbering and classifying ships in 1895, had become cumbersome with the new classes of ships being built during WWI. On 17 July 1920, the Navy introduces a new hull classification and numbering system, Bridge was designated as a "Storeship", AF-1. Prior to this, she had been classified "Auxiliary Special", type "Supply Ship", with no hull number.

In 1922, Bridge steamed for Europe, and duty with the US Naval Detachment, in Turkish Waters. Remaining a year in that area, she then joined Train, Squadron 1, Base Force, US Fleet, in servicing and provisioning the Fleet from bases on both the east and west coasts of the United States, the Caribbean, and Canal Zone. In 1937–1938, Bridge spent six months on temporary duty with the Asiatic Fleet. In 1940–1941, she made 11 voyages between California bases and Pearl Harbor; the tenth trip also included the outlying bases of Midway Island, Guam, and Wake Island.

Bridge's commanding officer, from July 1921 to July 1922, was Ernest J. King, future Commander-in-Chief, United States Atlantic Fleet, Commander-in-Chief, United States Fleet, Chief of Naval Operations, and Fleet Admiral, during World War II.

=== World War II ===
With the entry of the United States into World War II, Bridge expanded her Pacific voyages to include the Fiji, Tonga, and New Caledonia Islands. Between 10 August and 20 October 1942, she shuttled cargo between San Francisco and Alaska, and then returned to the South Pacific. Between October 1942 and April 1943, she carried cargo to Hawaii, Tonga, Loyalty Islands, and the Samoan Islands. From 2 April until 3 July 1943, she ferried supplies between Nouméa, New Caledonia, and Auckland, New Zealand. In July, she steamed to San Francisco, and thence to Alaska, where she operated until October. She returned to Pearl Harbor, on 3 November, and operated between the Hawaiian and Ellice Islands, until April 1944. Between 19 April 1944 and 27 April 1945 Bridge operated exclusively between Pearl Harbor and the Marshall Islands. During 9–22 May, and 11 July-13 August 1945, she landed supplies at Okinawa, returning to Pearl Harbor each time.

On 10 October 1945, Bridge departed Pearl Harbor, and steamed to Japan, via Okinawa, for occupation duty. While operating off Korea, on 1 November, she struck a mine and suffered considerable damage but no personnel casualties. She was towed to Japan, on 21 November, by the fleet tug Sioux, and underwent repairs at Sasebo, until January 1946. Bridge remained on occupation duty until June 1946.

== Fate ==
She was decommissioned at Sasebo, on 27 June 1946, and turned over to the Foreign Liquidation Commission for disposal. She was sold to the Madrigal Shipping Company, Manila, Philippines, on 22 December 1947. She was renamed SS Don Jose and was scrapped in Kudamatsu, Japan, in March 1953.

== Awards ==
Bridge received one battle star for her World War II service.

== Bibliography ==
- "Table 21 - Ships on Navy List June 30, 1919". Congressional Serial Set. U.S. Government Printing Office. 1921.
- "Bridge I (AF-1)". Dictionary of American Naval Fighting Ships. Naval History and Heritage Command. 24 March 2021. This article incorporates text from this source, which is in the public domain.
- "Standard Nomenclature for Naval Vessels: General Order No. 541, 17 July 1920". Dictionary of American Naval Fighting Ships. Naval History and Heritage Command. 8 August 2025. This article incorporates text from this source, which is in the public domain.
- "Fleet Admiral Ernest J. King Ninth Chief of Naval Operations March 26, 1942–December 15, 1945". Dictionary of American Naval Fighting Ships. Naval History and Heritage Command. 15 July 2016. This article incorporates text from this source, which is in the public domain.
- Priolo, Gary P. (5 March 2021). "USS Bridge (AF-1)". NavSource.
- Galiano, Rich. "njscuba.net R.C. Mohawk".
