= Alice Olin Dows =

American socialite and poet (1881–1963)

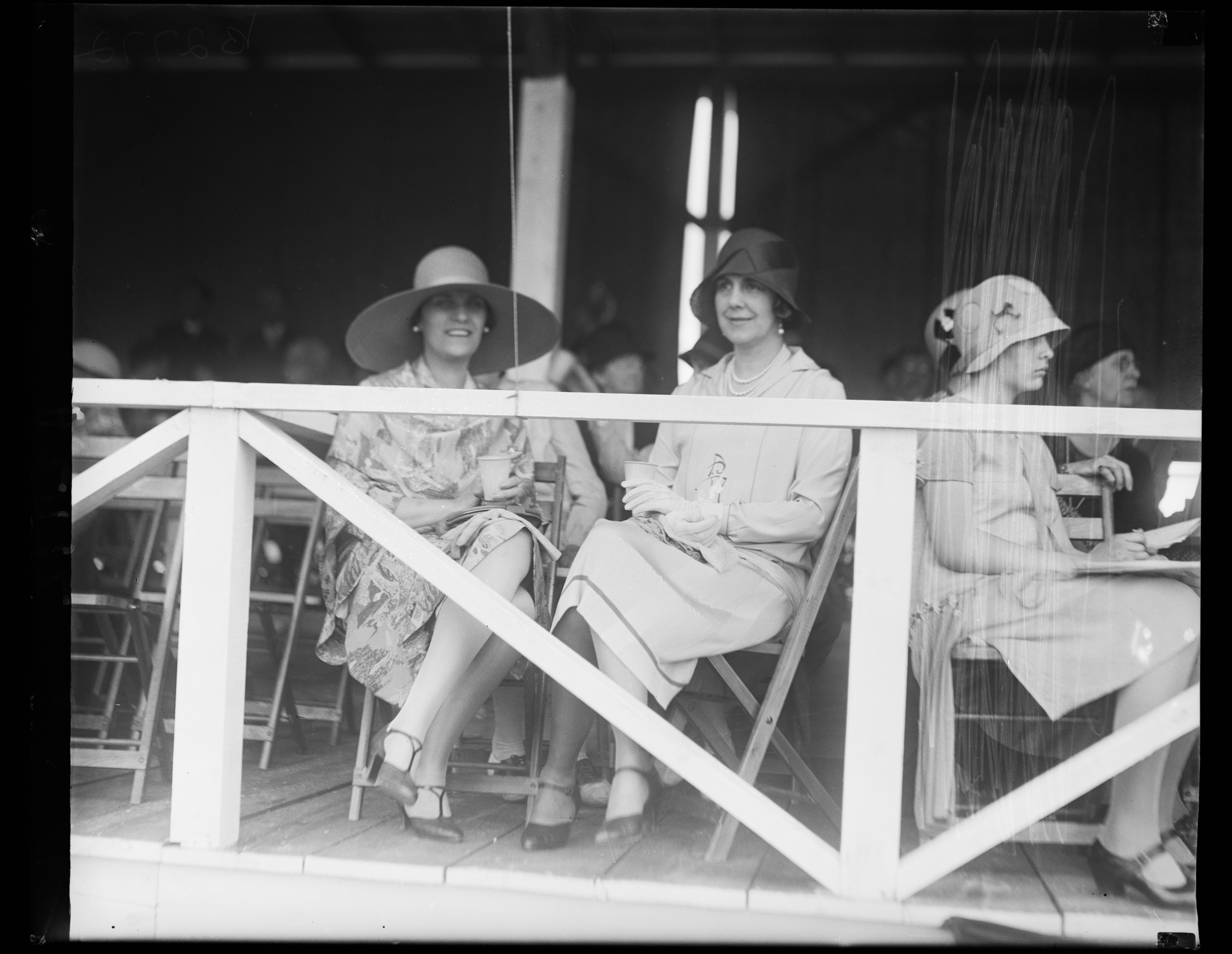
- Mrs. Tracy Dows and Mrs. Richard Aldrich, 1928.
- Born: April 9, 1881
- Died: August 31, 1963 (aged 82)
- Spouse: Tracy "Pup" Dows
- Children: 3
- Parent(s): Stephen Henry Olin; Alice Wadsworth Barlow
- Relatives: Stephen Olin (grandfather); Julia Lynch Olin (sister)

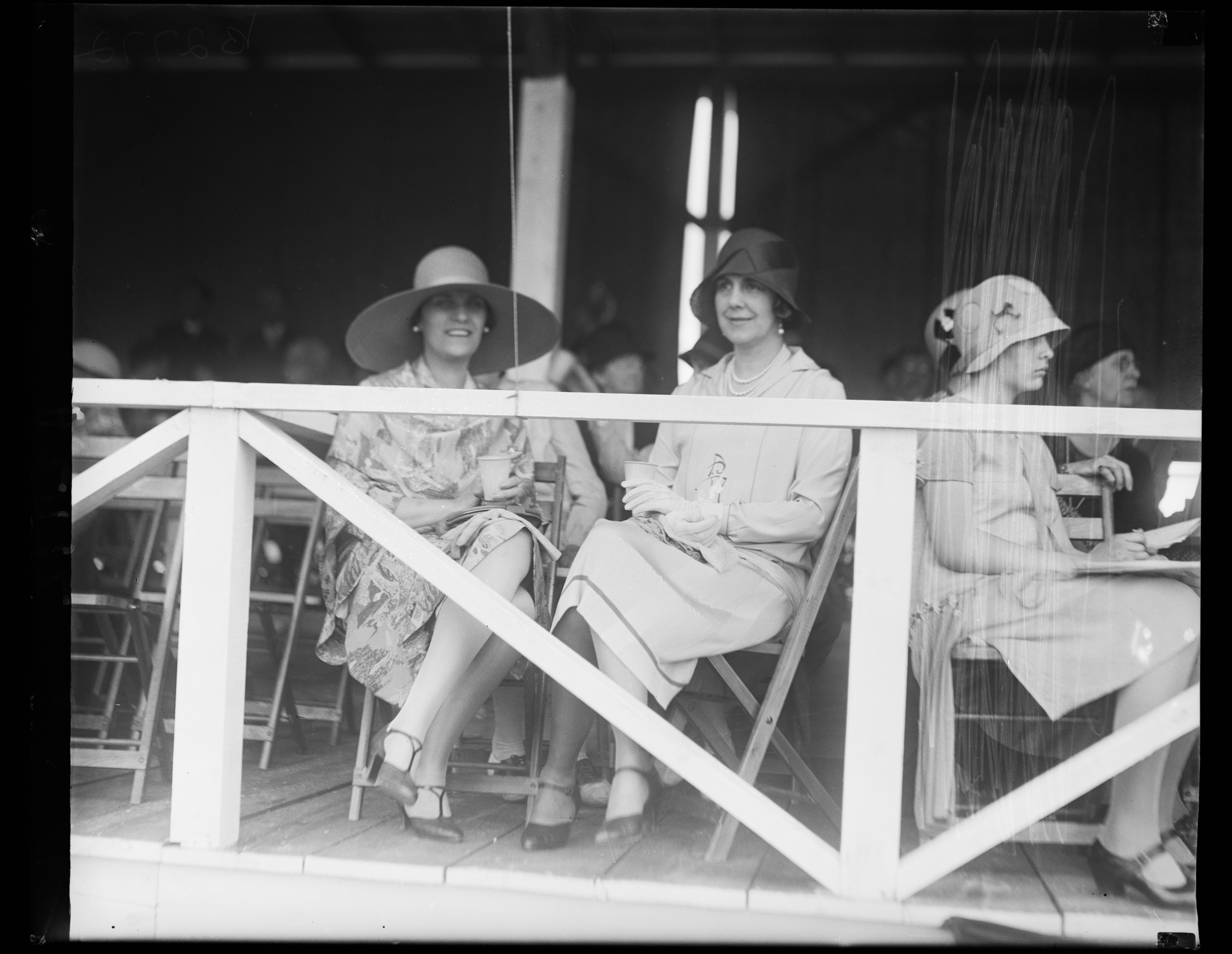
Mrs. Tracy Dows and Mrs. Richard Aldrich, 1928.

Alice Townsend Dows (née Alice Townsend Olin) (April 9, 1881 – August 31, 1963) was an American socialite and poet.

== Early life ==
Alice Townsend Olin was born on April 9, 1881. She was the eldest child of Stephen Henry Olin (1847–1925), the acting President of Wesleyan University from 1922 to 1923, and Alice Wadsworth "Elsie" (née Barlow) Olin (1853–1882).

Her younger sister was author and Baháʼí Julia Lynch Olin who married twice, including to former Lieutenant Governor of New York Lewis Stuyvesant Chanler.

After her mother's death in 1882 at the age of 29, her father remarried to Emeline Harriman, the former wife of William Earl Dodge III, in 1903. Emeline was the daughter of Oliver Harriman and the sister of Anne Harriman Vanderbilt, Oliver Harriman, Jr., J. Borden Harriman, and Herbert M. Harriman.

Her maternal grandparents were Samuel Latham Mitchill Barlow and Alice Cornell (née Townsend) Barlow. Her uncle was New York City Magistrate Peter Townsend Barlow.

Her paternal grandparents were Julia Matilda Lynch Olin and Rev. Dr. Stephen Olin, 2nd President of Wesleyan University and the son of Henry Olin, a member of the U.S. House of Representatives from Vermont.

== Career ==
Alice was known as a prominent Hudson Valley socialite and poet. She was a friend of Eleanor Roosevelt, Gore Vidal, and Margaret Chanler Aldrich (the sister of her brother-in-law Lewis Stuyvesant Chanler).

== Personal life ==
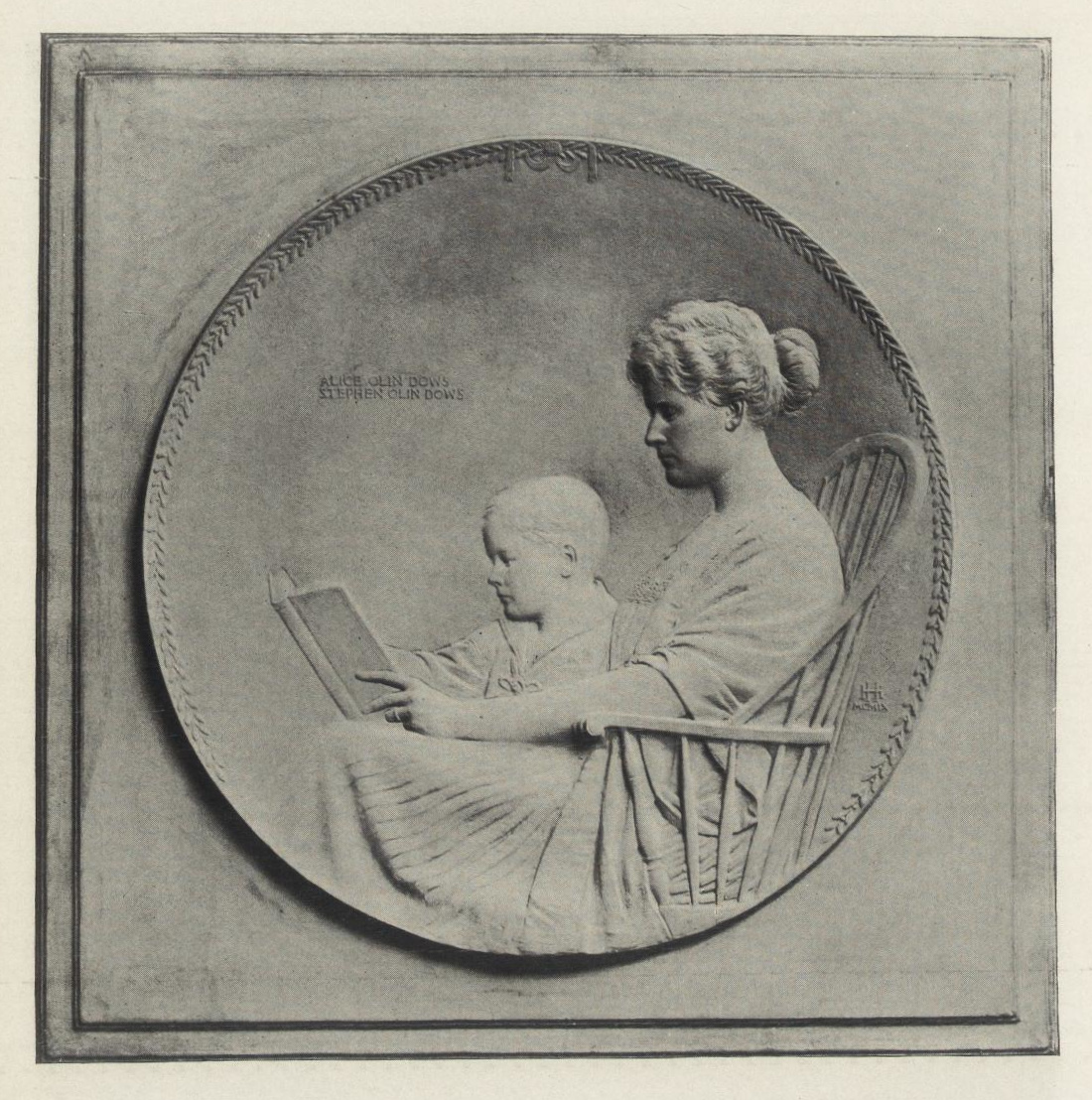
Alice Olin Dows and Stephen Olin Dows, by sculptor Henry Hering, 1909

In 1903, Alice was married to Harvard graduate Tracy "Pup" Dows (1871–1937) at her parents home in Rhinebeck, New York. He was a younger son of grain merchant David Dows and Margaret Esther (née Worcester) Dows.

Together, they were the parents of:

- Stephen Olin Dows (1904–1981), who studied at the Yale School of Art; he was a close friend of author Thomas Wolfe and U.S. President Franklin D. Roosevelt; in 1950, he married Chilean diplomat Carmen Vial de Senoret, a descendant of Ramón Freire, first president of Chile.
- Margaret "Bargy" Dows (1906–1992), who married Swedish diplomat Knut Richard Thyberg, with whom she had three children.
- Deborah Dows (1914–1994), who opened a riding school in the late 1930s known as the Southlands Foundation; in 1935, she married Harvard lawyer John Lancaster Burling, son of Edward B. Burling; they later divorced.

Her husband died unexpectedly, from an internal ailment, on July 3, 1937, at his apartment in London.

Dows died on August 31, 1963, and was buried at Rhinebeck Cemetery.

Her estate was divided equally amongst her three children.

=== Foxhollow Farm ===
Alice inherited the Olin family's sixty-acre homestead, Glenburn, in Rhinebeck, which had been enlarged by Henry Bacon and Harrie T. Lindeberg.

The Dows added to this by purchasing part of the Grasmere estate, where the Dows built a large country home in 1909 on their eventual 700-plus-acres known as Foxhollow Farm.

Following the death of Tracy Dow in 1937, their children elected to sell the Foxhollow mansion and some of the acreage around it.

Deborah inherited approximately 200 acres at the southern end of Foxhollow and started a horse-riding school called Southlands.

Their son inherited the Olin family homestead, Glenburn, where he lived as well as at his wife's family's estate in Chile.

In 2010, Bill and Hillary Clinton stayed at Glenburn while in Rhinebeck for their daughter Chelsea's wedding.
