= Judge Barlow =

Judge Barlow may refer to:

- David Barlow (judge) (born 1971), judge of the United States District Court for the District of Utah
- George H. Barlow (1921–1979), judge of the United States District Court for the District of New Jersey
- Peter Townsend Barlow (1857–1921), magistrate judge in New York City, primarily of the Women's Night Court
- Stephen Steele Barlow (1818–1900), county judge of Sauk County, Wisconsin
