= Samuel L. M. Barlow I =

American lawyer

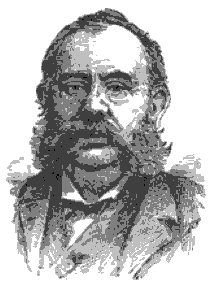
- Born: Samuel Latham Mitchill Barlow; January 5, 1826; Granville, Massachusetts, U.S.
- Died: July 10, 1889 (aged 63); Glen Cove, New York, U.S.
- Occupations: Lawyer, author
- Spouse: Alice Cornell Townsend
- Children: Alice Wadsworth Barlow; Peter Townsend Barlow
- Relatives: Julia Lynch Olin (granddaughter); Samuel Barlow II (grandson)

Samuel Latham Mitchill Barlow I (January 5, 1826 – July 10, 1889) was an American lawyer known for forming several legal partnerships, such as Bowdoin, Larocque & Barlow and Shipman, Barlow, Larocque. Barlow was also a major stakeholder in The New York World newspaper. Before passing the bar, he had studied by serving as seven years as an apprentice in a New York law practice.

== Early life ==
Samuel Barlow was born on January 5, 1826, in Granville, Massachusetts, the eldest child of Rhoda Hopkins (née Wadsworth) Barlow (1802–1880) and Dr. Samuel Bancroft Barlow (1798–1875), a physician who had graduated from Yale University.

He was descended from English settlers who had immigrated to the Massachusetts Bay Colony in 1620. He was named after uncle Samuel Latham Mitchill, the U.S. Representative and U.S. Senator from New York. His maternal grandfather was Timothy Wadsworth, a lineal descendant of Captain Joseph Wadsworth of Charter Oak fame. Samuel's family moved to New York City when he was young.

== Career ==
Barlow began working for a law firm, Melett & Gregg in either 1840 or 1842. He had worked for seven years at that practice as an apprentice and office assistant before being admitted to the bar. He was later made manager of Melett & Gregg.

In 1852, Barlow established a partnership with George R.J. Bowdoin and Jeremiah Laroque, to form the firm Bowdoin, Larocque and Barlow. Barlow worked in numerous high-profile and rewarding cases. At 23, he was paid $250,000 to settle claims after the Treaty of Guadalupe Hidalgo with Mexico. He successfully acted as a conciliator to Cornelius Vanderbilt and William Henry Aspinwall, ending their bitter feud.

At the end of the Franco-Prussian War, Barlow settled a dispute concerning a $1,600,000 contract to send arms to France. The arms were sent three months later. Among Barlow's most notable victories, he successfully removed Jay Gould from power over the Erie Railroad, and returned it to the railroad's stakeholders. The suit ended with a $9,000,000 settlement. Barlow was made a director and counsel of the railroad after the suit.

Upon the death of his two partners, Barlow formed a new partnership: Shipman, Barlow Larocque & Choate. The new firm became one of the most prominent practices in New York.

In politics, Barlow was a Democrat. He did not run for office. He was a major stakeholder in the newspaper The New York World, where he oversaw the paper's operations until 1869. Barlow was a member of the high-class Manhattan and Union clubs, the former of which he helped found.

== Personal life ==
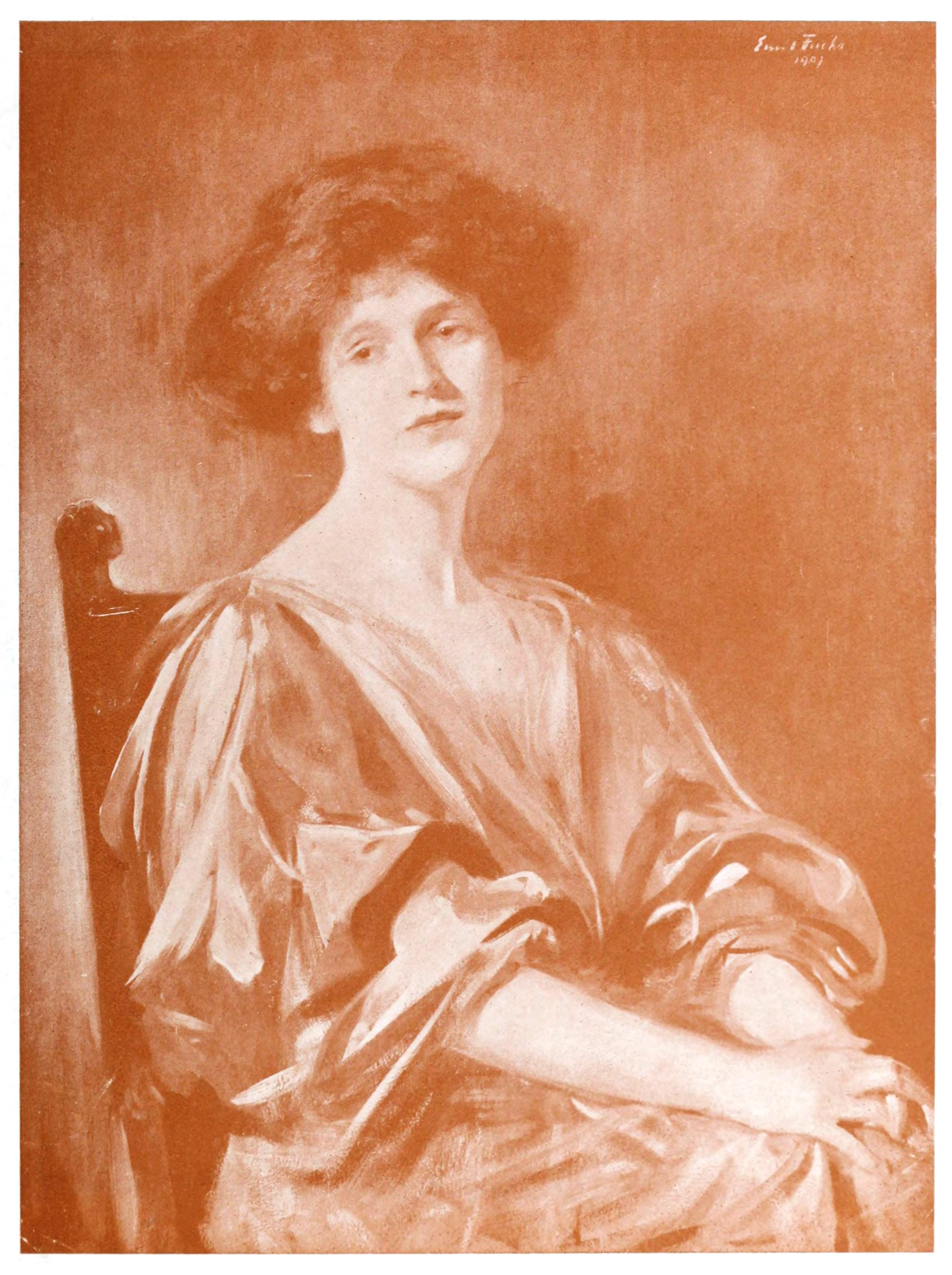
Portrait of Barlow's granddaughter, Julia Lynch Olin, by Emil Fuchs, 1908

Barlow enjoyed collecting fine art, and also had a large library. He married Alice Cornell Townsend (1833–1889), with whom he had one son and daughter:

- Alice Wadsworth Barlow (1853–1882), who married Stephen Henry Olin, a lawyer who served as the acting president of Wesleyan University.
- Peter Townsend Barlow (1857–1921), a lawyer and jurist who married Virginia Louise Matthews, sister of author Brander Matthews.

Barlow died on the morning of July 10, 1889, of heart failure at his summer home in Glen Cove, Long Island. Barlow's funeral service was held on July 12 at St. Paul's Episcopal Church in Glen Cove. Attendees included former Secretary of State Thomas F. Bayard and Gen. Fitz John Porter.

=== Descendants ===
Through his daughter Alice, he was the grandfather of two girls, Alice Townsend Olin (1881–1963), who married Tracy Dows, and Julia Lynch Olin (1882–1961), who was known for later leading the Reform Baháʼí Movement. She married J. Philip Benkard in 1902. They divorced in 1920 and she married Lewis Stuyvesant Chanler in 1921; he was the former Lt. Gov. of New York.

Through his son Peter, he was the grandfather of two boys, Edward Matthews Barlow, who died at the age of thirteen, and Samuel L. M. Barlow II (1892–1982), a Harvard educated pianist and composer.
