= Carmen Vial Freire Dows =

Chilean diplomat (1904–1978)

Ambassador of Chile to the Netherlands
- In office 1947–1950
- Monarch: Wilhelmina
- President: Gabriel González Videla

Personal details
- Born: Carmen Vial Freire; March 28, 1904 Santiago, Chile
- Died: January 1978 (aged 73) Puente Alto, Chile
- Spouse: Luis Browne Fernández () Octavio Señoret (died 1941) Olin Dows (m. 1950)
- Children: Luis Fernando Vial Browne
- Education: Harvard University

Carmen Vial Dows (née Carmen Vial Freire, formerly Carmen Vial Browne and Carmen Vial de Señoret) (March 28, 1904 – January 1978) was a Chilean diplomat who served as the Ambassador to the Netherlands.

== Early life ==
Carmen Viale Freire was born in Santiago, Chile on March 28, 1904, into an aristocratic family and was educated by English and French governesses. She was one of eight children born to Donna Carolina Freire Valdés and Don Pedro Daniel del Carmen Vial Carvallo. Her father was a founder of the La Granja, its first mayor, and deputy for San Fernando from 1906 to 1909.

Her paternal grandfather was Alejandro Vial Guzmán, the Chilean Minister of Finance from 1856 to 1857 under Manuel Montt. Through her mother, she was a great-granddaughter of Ramón Freire, the first President of Chile. Her maternal grandfather was Francisco Freire Caldera, the Minister of Foreign Affairs under José Manuel Balmaceda.

== Career ==
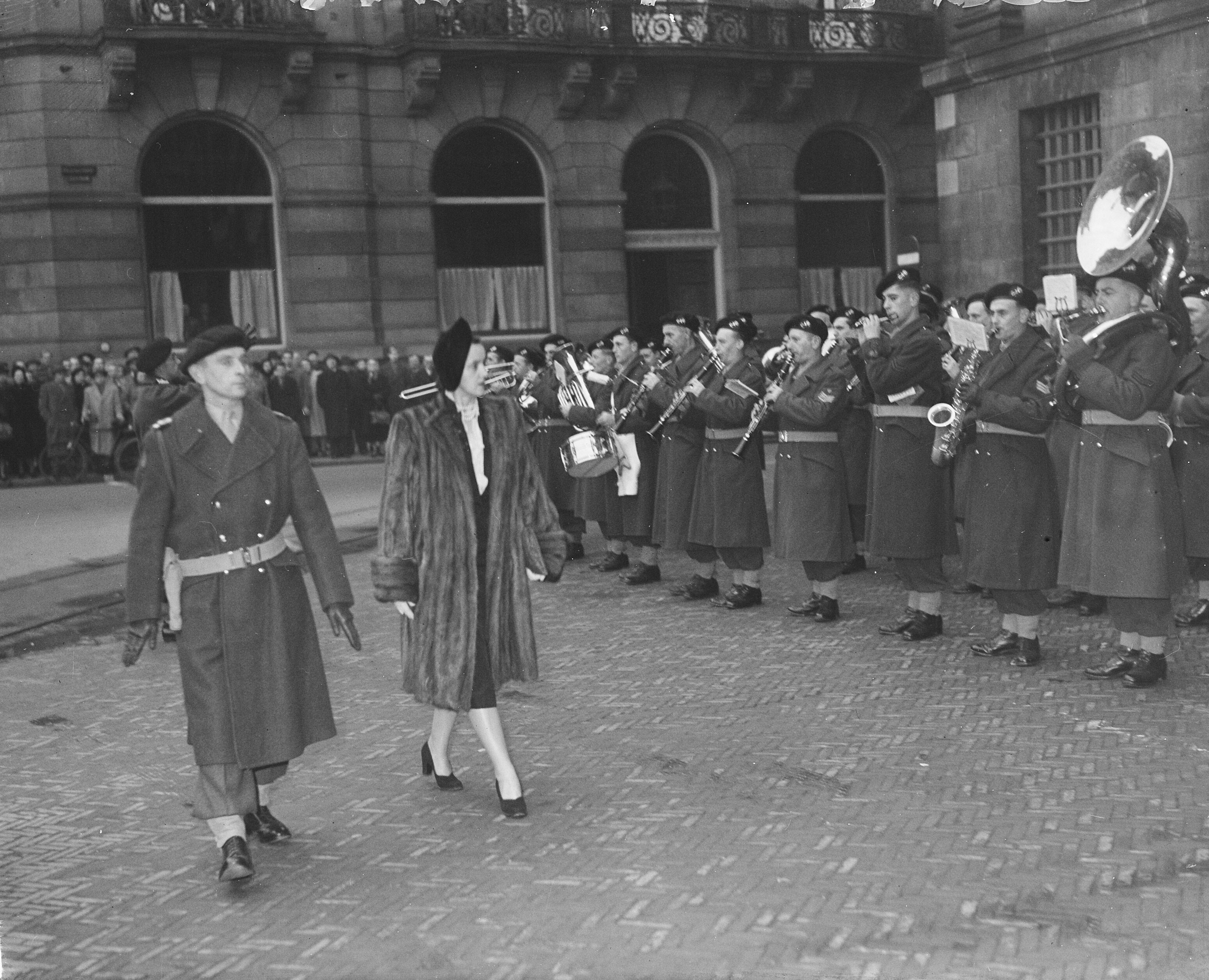
Queen Wilhelmina receives envoy from Chile, Mrs. Carmen Vial de Señoret, 1949

Upon the death of her second husband in 1941, Carmen joined the Chilean Diplomatic Corps and she began serving as Cultural attaché in the Embassy of Chile, Washington, D.C. before becoming consul in Boston a year and a half later. While in Boston, she studied Economics and International Trade at Harvard University.

In 1944, she was a Chilean representative to the Bretton Woods Conference in New Hampshire, the gathering of 730 delegates from all the Allied nations to regulate the international monetary and financial order after the conclusion of World War II.

In 1947, during the presidency of Gabriel González Videla, she was appointed the Chilean Ambassador to the Netherlands, serving in The Hague until 1950. She later served in her country's delegation to the Plenary Session of the United Nations.

== Personal life ==
Carmen was married three times. Her first marriage was to Chilean architect Luis Browne Fernández (1898–1944), best known for designing the Presidential Palace of Cerro Castillo. Before their divorce, they were the parents of:

- Luis Fernando Vial Browne (1930–2022), he married Edith Gammack of New York, daughter of Thomas Hubbard Gammack and Mrs. William Douglas Burden, in 1957. They divorced in 1971 and he married Nathalie Kuhn in 1974.

Her second marriage was to Octavio Señoret, who was a governor and parliamentarian. He was the son of Manuel Señoret Astaburuaga and María Mercedes Silva. In 1939, he was appointed Chilean Ambassador to the United Kingdom and they moved to London where they lived through World War II and she joined the Red Cross. They remained married until his death in 1941 in Lisbon, Portugal.

Her third marriage was in 1950 to Stephen Olin Dows, a muralist who had been a fine-arts consultant in the Roosevelt administration. A son of Alice Olin Dows, her husband owned a large home in Rhinebeck, New York known as Glenburn, and they maintained a home in Georgetown, Washington, D.C.

After a long illness, Dows died in January 1978 at her family's farm in Puente Alto, Chile. Olin Dows died in 1981.

Diplomatic posts
Preceded by	Ambassador of Chile to the Netherlands; 1947–1950	Succeeded by
