= Thomas Burch (circuit rider) =

American clergyman (1778–1849)

Thomas Burch (1778–1849) was an early nineteenth-century Methodist circuit rider in the United States and Canada.

Burch was born on 30 August 1778, in Tyrone County, Ireland, to Thomas and Eleanor Burch. He was their eldest son. Burch's parents raised him in the Church of England. Burch converted to Methodism in 1801, after hearing sermons by Gideon Ousley. Soon afterwards, his mother and siblings converted to Methodism as well. His father was already deceased. They formed a Methodist Society in Tyrone County, which soon expanded to hundreds of members.

Burch travelled to the United States, arriving on 5 June 1803. He travelled there with his mother, sister and brother Robert. He settled in Lancaster County, Pennsylvania, near Boehm's Chapel. Burch became active in the Methodist Church there, receiving a local preacher's licence in 1804, and being received on trial as a circuit rider by the annual Philadelphia Conference of 1805. After three years of circuit riding, Burch was promoted to the office of deacon and elder.

Within the church, Burch came to be well respected. When the first delegated annual General Methodist conference was held in 1812, Burch was sent to represent the Philadelphia Conference. At the conference Burch was assigned to Quebec City. He managed to arrive there before the outbreak of the War of 1812. Nathan Bangs, who had been assigned to Montreal, was unable to fulfill his role there, and Burch covered both circuits, focusing on the more populated Montreal Circuit. Of those circuit riders assigned to the Canadas in 1812, only Burch and Robert Hibbard managed to get across the border, and Hibbard drowned in the Saint Lawrence River soon after. Burch remained in this position for three years, as it was impossible to reassign circuit riders across the border during the war. Burch neglected his duties on the Quebec City Circuit in large part, travelling there only twice in his first year. During 1812 and 1813, membership in the Methodist Church in Quebec City dwindled from 40 individuals to 20.

After the war, Burch returned to the United States. He married Mary Smith of Philadelphia on 25 May 1816. Burch remained highly respected among his peers; he was chosen to attend the delegated conferences in 1820 and again in 1828. The couple had a son, Robert A. Burch, born 4 August 1832, in Albany, New York. Other children of the couple were Mary Eleanor, Sophia Gough, Thomas, Jane Sophia, and Anne Elisabeth. Burch continued circuit riding in the United States until 1835, when he was declared supernumerary due to illness. He returned to circuit riding in 1841, but retired again in 1845, as his wife had died the previous year. He retired to Yonkers, New York, where he remained until shortly before his death, when he went to live with his son, Thomas H. Burch, in Brooklyn. Burch died on 22 August 1849, of a heart ailment.
