= Helen Fairchild Smith =

Helen Fairchild Smith (died 1926) was the daughter of Augustus William Smith.

She went to Wells College in 1876 as Lady Principal and Professor of English Literature. From 1894 to 1905 she was the Dean of the college. She served on the Board of Trustees from 1887 until her death in 1926.

She was also a friend and mentor to First Lady Frances Folsom Cleveland (class of 1885) and visited her in the White House.
