= Stephen Olin =

American clergyman and academic

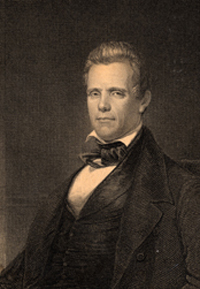

President of Wesleyan University
- In office 1839–1841
- Preceded by: Willbur Fisk
- Succeeded by: Nathan Bangs

3rd President of Wesleyan University
- In office 1842–1851
- Preceded by: Nathan Bangs
- Succeeded by: Augustus W. Smith

1st President of Randolph Macon College
- In office 1834–1836
- Preceded by: Office created
- Succeeded by: Landon C. Garland

Personal details
- Born: March 2, 1797 Leicester, Vermont
- Died: August 15, 1851 (aged 54) Middletown, Connecticut
- Resting place: Wesleyan University Cemetery, Middletown, Connecticut
- Spouse: Julia Matilda Lynch
- Relations: Alice Olin Dows (granddaughter); Julia Lynch Olin (granddaughter)
- Parent(s): Henry Olin; Lois Richardson
- Education: Middlebury College

Stephen Olin (March 2, 1797 – August 15, 1851) was an American educator and minister.

== Early life ==
Olin was born in Leicester, Vermont, on March 2, 1797. He was one of ten children born to Henry Olin (1768–1837), a member of the U.S. House of Representatives from Vermont, and Lois Richardson (d. 1814). His father was the nephew of Gideon Olin (1743–1823) and the cousin of Abram B. Olin (1808–1879), both of whom also served as members of the House of Representatives from Vermont.

In 1820, Olin graduated from Middlebury College in 1820.

== Career ==
Seeking a better climate for his poor health, Olin traveled to the southern United States, where he found employment as a teacher at Tabernacle Academy in Mount Ariel, in the Abbeville area of South Carolina. After having a religious awakening at the age of 25, he gave up consideration of the practice of law and became ordained into the Methodist Episcopal Church; Olin was recognized as a deacon by the Milledgeville, Georgia, conference in January 1826. He then served a pastorate in Charleston, but his health prevented him from continuing in that capacity. He became professor of belle-lettres at the University of Georgia in 1827. He was the first President of Randolph-Macon College (1834–1836) but resigned for health reasons and was succeeded by Dr. Landon C. Garland. He later served as president of Wesleyan University (1842–1851).

In 1844, at the general conference of the Methodists, Olin called on his friend, Bishop James Andrew, to resign his office, on the grounds the latter owned slaves. Olin himself was criticized because his first wife (Mary E. Bostwick, whom he married in 1827) had owned slaves.

== Personal life ==
Stephen Olin married Mary Ann Bostwick, who died in Naples, Italy, during the couple's time in Europe after Olin resigned the presidency of Randolph-Macon College.

He was later married to Julia Matilda Lynch (1814–1879), the daughter of James Lynch. Together, they were the parents of:

- Stephen Henry Olin (1847–1925), who married Alice Wadsworth Barlow (1853–1882), daughter of Samuel Latham Mitchill Barlow and Alice Cornell Townsend.

Olin died on August 15, 1851, in Middletown, Connecticut.

=== Legacy ===
The Williamsbridge neighborhood of Olinville in the Bronx, New York, began as two towns named for him (founded in 1852).

== Publications ==
- Inaugural Address Delivered by the Rev. Stephen Olin, President of Randolph-Macon College, on the Occasion of His Induction into Office, 5th March, 1834 (1834) Richmond: Nesbitt & Walker.
- Travels in Egypt, Arabia Petræa, and the Holy Land (1843) New York: Harper & Brothers.
- Resources and Duties of Christian Young Men: A Discourse to the Graduating Class of Wesleyan University, August 1845 (1846) New York: Lane & Tippett.
- The Relations of Christian Principle to Mental Culture: A Discourse to the Graduating Class of Wesleyan University, July 1848 (1848) New York: Lane & Scott.
- Early Piety, the Basis of Elevated Character: A Discourse to the Graduating Class of Wesleyan University, August 1850 (1851) New York: Lane & Scott.
- The Works of Stephen Olin (1852) and Greece and the Golden Horn (1854) were edited by his second wife, Julia Matilda Olin, and published posthumously.
- College Life: Its Theory and Practice (1867) New York: Harper & Brothers.

Academic offices
Preceded by Office created	President of Randolph-Macon College; 1834–1836	Succeeded by Landon Cabell Garland
Preceded by Nathan Bangs	President of Wesleyan University; 1842–1851	Succeeded by Augustus William Smith
