= Samuel L. M. Barlow II =

American composer, pianist and art critic (1892-1982)

- Born: Samuel Latham Mitchell Barlow II; June 1, 1892; New York City, New York, U.S.
- Died: September 19, 1982 (aged 90); Wyndmoor, Pennsylvania, U.S.
- Resting place: West Laurel Hill Cemetery, Bala Cynwyd, Pennsylvania, U.S.
- Occupations: Composer, musician and art critic

Samuel Latham Mitchell Barlow II (June 1, 1892 – September 19, 1982) was an American composer, pianist and art critic. His compositional style was conservative and he once said that he wrote "tunes that wouldn't shock Papa Brahms." But, his music frequently explored new performance techniques and practices; in addition, he used slide projections to accompany his 1936 symphonic concerto Babar.

== Early life and education ==
Barlow was born in New York City on June 1, 1892. He was the second son of Peter Townsend Barlow, a New York City magistrate, and his wife Virginia Louise (Matthews). Her brother was author Brander Matthews. Barlow was named after his paternal grandfather, a prominent Wall Street attorney. Samuel's older brother, Edward Mitchell Barlow, was named after their maternal grandfather, a successful merchant. Edward Barlow died in 1901 at the age of thirteen.

Samuel Barlow graduated with the Harvard Class of 1914. He studied at the Institute of Musical Art (Juilliard School) in New York City, under Percy Goetschius and Franklin Robinson, and later in Paris with Isidor Philipp at the Paris Conservatoire, and in Rome with Ottorino Respighi at the Accademia Nazionale di Santa Cecilia. During the First World War, he put his music studies on hold while serving as a lieutenant with US Army Intelligence.

== Career ==
Early in his career, Samuel Barlow taught at Settlement schools, contributed to the literary journal North American Review, and served as the first chairman of the New York City Community Chorus. Beginning in 1917, it presented free concerts on Sunday afternoons at Central Park.

In 1935 Barlow became the first American composer to have an opera presented at the Opéra-Comique in Paris; the opera house staged his one-act work Mon Ami Pierrot. The opera was based on the life of Jean-Baptiste Lully and used a French-language libretto by Sacha Guitry. The opera was well received, and he was awarded the prestigious Légion d'honneur for his achievement.

The following year the Philadelphia Orchestra under Leopold Stokowski performed his Concerto for Magic Lantern and Symphony Orchestra, Barlow's adaptation of the French children's book, Babar the Elephant. In 1937 Barlow contributed music to the Broadway Musical Amphitryon, starring Alfred Lunt and Lynn Fontanne. Barlow composed one other opera, Amanda, which was never performed. He wrote a number of orchestral and chamber music pieces.

His compositional style was conservative for his day, and he once stated that he wrote "tunes that wouldn't shock Papa Brahms." He frequently explored new performance techniques and practices in his music. In addition, he used slide projections to accompany his adaptation of Babar.

Barlow lived much of his life in New York City, where he promoted classical music in various civic and professional organizations for several decades. He was the first chairman of the New York City Community Chorus. He was also a regular contributor to the journal Modern Music, published by the American League of Composers. In the 1950s he was president of the board of the American Opera Society.

== Marriages ==
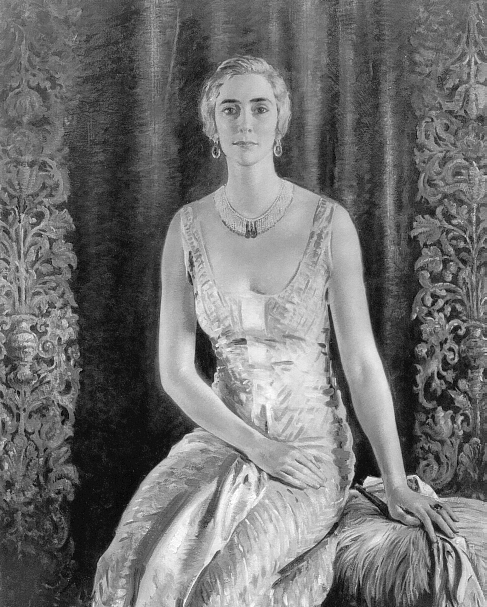
Portrait of Ernesta Beaux by William Bruce Ellis Ranken, 1933

Samuel L. M. Barlow married Evelyn Harris Brown on April 25, 1916, at New York City. Evelyn, a noted diseuse who had performed on both sides of the Atlantic, had previously been married to Herbert Pomeroy Brown, a Wall Street broker. Their only child, daughter Audrey Townsend, was born in 1917. Their marriage ended eight years later in Paris. Evelyn was granted a divorce on grounds of abandonment.

Barlow married again on May 10, 1928, to Aimee Ernesta Drinker, then called Ernesta Beaux. She had previously been married to Ambassador William C. Bullitt. Ernesta was the daughter of Sturgis Drinker, one-time president of Lehigh University. As a child, she was the subject of several paintings by her aunt Cecilia Beaux.

After her divorce from Ambassador Bullitt, Drinker changed her name to Ernesta Beaux. She married Samuel Barlow at her aunt Cecilia's New York residence. At the time of their marriage, Ernesta was an interior decorator. She became well known on the national lecture circuit and as a writer, commenting on numerous social issues of the day. During World War II, she discussed drafting women for national service.

== Barlow Chateau at Èze ==
In the early 1920s Samuel Barlow fell in love with a charming French medieval village discovered while vacationing along the Mediterranean, midway between Nice and Monaco. Èze occupies a pinnacle of rock some 1,400 feet (430 meters) above Cape Ferrat on the French Riviera. On a clear day one could see the peaks of Corsica to the south and virtually all the Riviera westward toward Toulon. After discussions with the village mayor, Barlow received permission to purchase a dozen or so houses that were clinging to the cliff's side. Over the next few years, Barlow demolished them to build a picturesque estate on the large site. it blended in with the surrounding architecture. He made it a family retreat and a mecca for artists and intellectuals.

== Death ==
Samuel Latham Mitchell Barlow died on September 19, 1982, at the age of 90 at the Springfield Retirement Residence in Wyndmoor, Pennsylvania. He was interred at West Laurel Hill Cemetery in Bala Cynwyd, Pennsylvania. His wife Ernesta Beaux Barlow had died the year before, at the age of 89.

== Works ==
Partial

- 3 Songs from the Chinese (voice and ensemble, 1924)
- Vocalise (1926)
- Alba (symphonic poem, 1927)
- Ballo Sardo (ballet, 1928)
- Circus Overture (1930)
- Piano Concerto (1931)
- Scherzo (string quartet, 1933)
- Spanish Quarter (piano, 1933)
- Mon ami Pierrot (opera, 1934)
- Biedermeier Waltzes (1935)
- Babar (symphonic concerto, 1936)
- Amanda (opera, 1936)
- Aphitryon 38 (incidental music, 1937)
- Leda (1939)
- Sousa ad Parnassum (1939)
- Conversation with Tchekhov (piano trio, 1940)
- Jardin de La Notre (piano)

== Additional reading ==
- Hitchcock, H. Wiley, "Samuel Barlow". The New Grove Dictionary of Music and Musicians online.
