= USRC Mohawk =

Ship of the U.S. Revenue Cutter Service

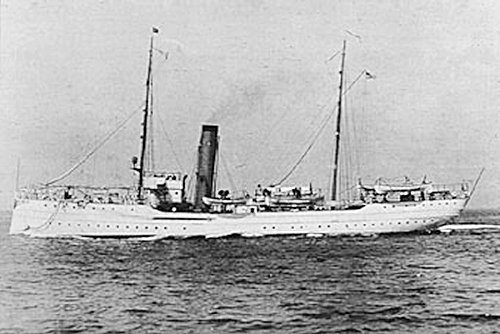
- USRC Mohawk

History

United States
- Name: Mohawk
- Namesake: The Mohawk tribe
- Builder: William R. Trigg Company, Richmond, Virginia
- Commissioned: 10 May 1904 into United States Revenue Cutter Service
- Recommissioned: 6 April 1917 by United States Navy
- Fate: Sunk in collision near; Sandy Hook, New Jersey 1 October 1917.; Derelict sold 7 February 1921 for US$111.00

General characteristics
- Displacement: 1,150 long tons (1,168 t)
- Length: 205 ft 6 in (62.64 m)
- Beam: 32 ft 0 in (9.75 m)
- Draft: 12 ft 7 in (3.84 m)
- Installed power: triple-expansion steam engine,25 in (0.64 m), 37.5 in (0.95 m), 56.25 in (1.429 m) diameter X 30 in (0.76 m) stroke, single screw
- Armament: 2 × 6 pounder rapid fire guns (1907); 4 × 6 pounder rapid fire guns (1914)

USRC Mohawk, was a steel steam powered revenue cutter built for the U.S. Revenue Cutter Service by William R. Trigg Company at Richmond, Virginia. Her primary duties in the Revenue Cutter Service and Coast Guard were assisting vessels in distress and enforcing navigational laws as well as a derelict destroyer. Mohawk was sunk after a collision with another vessel in October 1917.

== Construction ==
Mohawk was steel-hulled cutter constructed by William R. Trigg Company of Richmond, Virginia. (Note: Colton mentions the bankruptcy of the Trigg Company in 1903 and the fact that several ships under construction in the yard either were not finished or had to be completed by their owners. Mohawk evidently had to be completed by the Revenue Cutter Service. It is not clear whether this was done under a contract to some third party or the work was completed by service personnel.) She was powered by a triple-expansion steam engine propelling a single screw. She was commissioned into the United States Revenue Cutter Service on 10 May 1904 at Arundel Cove, Curtis Bay, Maryland, with Captain Worth G. Ross commanding.

== History ==
=== 1904–1917 ===
Shortly after commissioning, Mohawk was based at Tompkinsville, New York, where she cruised the Atlantic Ocean and adjacent waters between Nantucket Shoals, Massachusetts, and the Delaware breakwater. Her primary duties were "assisting vessels in distress and enforcing the various navigational laws" including patrolling regattas. She also served as a derelict destroyer. On 1 April 1905, Captain Ross was relieved by Captain Byron L. Reed because Ross had been appointed as Chief of Division, Revenue Cutter Service. In June 1905, she patrolled several regattas in addition to her regular patrol duties. On 30 July, Chief of Division Ross visited Mohawk at Whitestone, New York. On 25 August she responded to orders to assist SS Barnes which was grounded 1.75 mi (2.82 km) from Jones Beach Life-Saving Station.

In June 1906 Mohawk again patrolled several regattas in her patrol area in addition to her regular duties as well as the patrol area of USRC Gresham while she was laid up for repairs. In December she was called to the scenes of several derelicts in her patrol area to destroy them.

On 12 February 1907 Mohawk assisted in helping the survivors of a collision that occurred in her patrol area between SS Larchmont and schooner Knowlton.

On 26 February 1909 Mohawk ran aground in Hell Gate on Hog Back Ledge. She was refloated, repaired and returned to service.

On 6 March 1910, Mohawk assisted by USRC Onondaga towed the abandoned waterlogged four-masted schooner Asbury Fountain to Norfolk, Virginia after she suffered a collision with SS Jamestown.

In April 1912, Mohawk and USRC Acushnet helped rescue the crew from SS Ontario, which was ablaze off Montauk Point, Long Island.

On 26 April 1912, Mohawk was called upon to transport President William H. Taft from New York City's Recreation Pier to Governors Island and back on the occasion of the funeral of Major General Frederick Dent Grant, son of President Ulysses S. Grant. In September, she was tasked with helping Dr. George Styles of the U.S. Department of Agriculture in his study of the bottom of the Potomac River.

On 5 July 1913, Mohawk received Secretary of the Treasury William Gibbs McAdoo aboard for a cruise from her moorings at Tompkinsville. On 6 September she arrived at the RCS Depot at Curtis Bay, Maryland for an overhaul. On 7 October she was placed out of commission and her crew was sent to USRC Itasca. With the overhaul completed, the crew returned from Itasca and Mohawk was re-commissioned 17 April 1914. On 12 June received RCS Captain-Commandant Ellsworth P. Bertholf and party aboard during the annual Harvard–Yale Regatta at New London, Connecticut On 5 August, at the beginning of World War I, Mohawk was assigned to enforce the United States' neutrality laws and was directed to board all foreign vessels leaving port to inspect cargoes and documents. She continued that duty until 19 March 1915 when she returned to her regular patrol areas. When the Revenue Cutter Service merged with the United States Life-Saving Service to form the United States Coast Guard on 28 January 1915, she became known as USCGC Mohawk, a United States Coast Guard cutter. She ran aground on Bartlett Reef (41.2859°N 072.1348°W) in Long Island Sound on 29 May 1916 but was refloated, drydocked, repaired, and returned to service.

=== U.S. Navy service ===
Mohawk was temporarily transferred to the United States Navy on 6 April 1917 for service in World War I retaining her Coast Guard crew. She was the fourth ship known by that name commissioned into the Navy. While serving on coastal duty in connection with convoy operations, she was struck in Ambrose Channel by the British tanker SS Vennacher and sank on 1 October 1917 off Sandy Hook, New Jersey. All 77 crew members were rescued by the U.S. Navy patrol vessels USS Mohican and USS Sabalo. (Note: Johnson claims all crew members of Mohawk were picked up by the U.S. Navy storeship USS Bridge and uses the reference "Johnston and Crisp" as his source. Charles E. Johnston and Richard O. Crisp were two Coast Guard captains who authored A History of the Coast Guard in the World War in a four-volume unpublished typescript. The Coast Guard Historian's Office website cites no specific source about USS Mohican and USS Sabalo rescuing crewmen from Mohawk.) The water was deemed too deep to warrant salvage operations so Mohawk was left where she sank. On 7 February 1921, salvage rights were sold to H.L. Gotham Corporation of New York City for US$111.00.

== Notes ==
=== References ===
- "Mohawk". Dictionary of American Naval Fighting Ships. U.S. Navy Naval History and Heritage Command.
- "Mohawk, 1904". Assets, water. U.S. Coast Guard Historian's Office.
- "R.C. Mohawk". New Jersey Scuba Diving. NJScuba.net. Archived from the original on 18 February 2020.
- "Record of Movements, Vessels of the United States Coast Guard, 1790–December 31, 1933 (1989 reprint)" (PDF). U.S. Coast Guard, Department of Transportation.
- "Richmonder took risk on shipbuilding business". TMCnet.com. Richmond (Virginia) Times-Dispatch. 23 May 2007.
- "U.S. Coast Guard General Order No. 1" (PDF). Historic Documents & Publications. U.S. Coast Guard Historian's Office.
- Register of the officers, vessels and stations of the United States Coast Guard, January 1, 1918. U.S. Government Printing Office. 1918.
- Canney, Donald L. (1995). U.S. Coast Guard and Revenue Cutters, 1790–1935. Naval Institute Press, Annapolis, Maryland. ISBN 978-1-55750-101-1.
- Colton, Tim. "William R. Trigg Co., Richmond VA". Shipyard Index. Shipbuilding History.
- Eger, Christopher L. (March 2021). "Hudson Fulton Celebration, Part II". Warship International. LVIII (1): 58–81. ISSN 0043-0374.
- Evans, Stephen H. (1949). The United States Coast Guard 1790–1915: A Definitive History. Naval Institute Press, Annapolis, Maryland.
- Johnson, Robert Irwin (1987). Guardians of the Sea, History of the United States Coast Guard, 1915 to the Present. Naval Institute Press, Annapolis, Maryland. ISBN 978-0-87021-720-3.
- King, Irving H. (1996). The Coast Guard Expands, 1865–1915: New Roles, New Frontiers. Naval Institute Press, Annapolis, Maryland. ISBN 978-1-55750-458-6.
- Larzelere, Alex (2003). The Coast Guard in World War I: An Untold Story. Naval Institute Press, Annapolis, Maryland. ISBN 978-1-55750-476-0.
