= Francisco Freire =

Chilean lawyer, farmer and politician

Francisco Freire Caldera
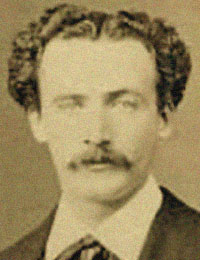

Minister of Foreign Affairs
- In office 30 October 1886 – 28 June 1887
- President: José Manuel Balmaceda
- Preceded by: Joaquín Godoy Cruz
- Succeeded by: Miguel Luis Amunátegui

Personal details
- Born: 1839 Santiago, Chile
- Died: July 30, 1900 (aged 60–61)
- Spouse: Enriqueta Valdés Solar
- Relations: Carmen Vial Freire Dows (granddaughter)
- Parent(s): Ramón Freire; Manuela Caldera Mascaiano
- Education: National Institute
- Alma mater: University of Chile

Francisco Freire Caldera (1839 – July 30, 1900) was a Chilean lawyer, farmer and politician.

== Early life ==
Francisco was born in Santiago in 1839, the son of Manuela Caldera Mascaiano and Gen. Ramón Freire Serrano, one of the principal leaders of the liberal Pipiolo movement who served as the Chilean head of state on several occasions before the War of the Confederation.

He studied at the National Institute and the University of Chile before being sworn in as a lawyer on December 22, 1863.

== Career ==
He served as deputy for Illapel from 1882 to 1885, serving on the Qualification Commissions of Powers and Budget. He was a substitute senator for Tarapacá from 1885 to 1891, but was disqualified for having accepted an administrative position.

In 1886, he was appointed Mayor of Santiago, which he resigned in the same year to hold the position of Minister of Foreign Affairs and Colonization from October 30, 1886, to June 28, 1887. From March 11, 1887, to March 26, 1887, he served as Deputy Minister of Justice, Public Instruction and Worship. He also held the position of Mayor of Valparaíso.

In 1898 he occupied the Intendancy of Tarapacá and the following year, again that of Santiago.

== Personal life ==
He married Enriqueta Valdés Solar, with whom he had six children: Elisa, Carolina, Alfonso, Isabel, Julia and María.

Francisco died on July 30, 1900.

=== Descendants ===
Through his daughter Carolina Freire Valdés, he was a grandfather of diplomat Carmen Vial Freire Dows.
