= Stephen Henry Olin =

American lawyer

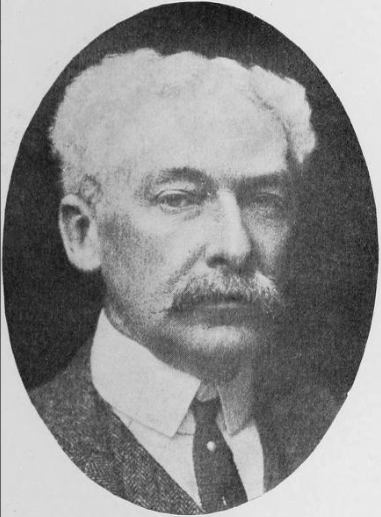

Acting President of Wesleyan University
- In office 1922–1923
- Preceded by: William A. Shanklin
- Succeeded by: James L. McConaughy

Personal details
- Born: April 22, 1847 Middletown, Connecticut, U.S.
- Died: August 6, 1925 (aged 78) New York City, New York, U.S.
- Spouses: Alice Wadsworth Barlow (died 1882) Emeline Harriman Dodge (m. 1903)
- Relations: Henry Olin (grandfather)
- Children: Alice Olin Dows; Julia Lynch Olin
- Parent(s): Stephen Olin; Julia Matilda Lynch Olin

Stephen Henry Olin (April 22, 1847 – August 6, 1925) was an American lawyer and the acting president of Wesleyan University and a member of New York society during the Gilded Age.

== Early life ==
Olin was born on April 22, 1847, in Middletown, Connecticut. He was the son of Stephen Olin (1797–1851) and Julia Matilda (née Lynch) Olin (1814–1879), his father's second wife after his first marriage to Mary Bostwick. His father, a lawyer who became an ordained minister of the Methodist Episcopal Church, served as the first president of Randolph Macon College, from 1834 to 1836, and later served as president of Wesleyan University from 1839 until his death in 1851.

His maternal grandfather was James Lynch. His paternal grandparents were U.S. Representative from Vermont Henry Olin, and Lois Richardson Olin. His grandfather was the nephew of Gideon Olin and a cousin of Abram B. Olin, both of whom also served as members of the House of Representatives from Vermont.

Olin graduated from Wesleyan University in 1866 and received the honorary LL.D. from the university in 1894.

== Career ==
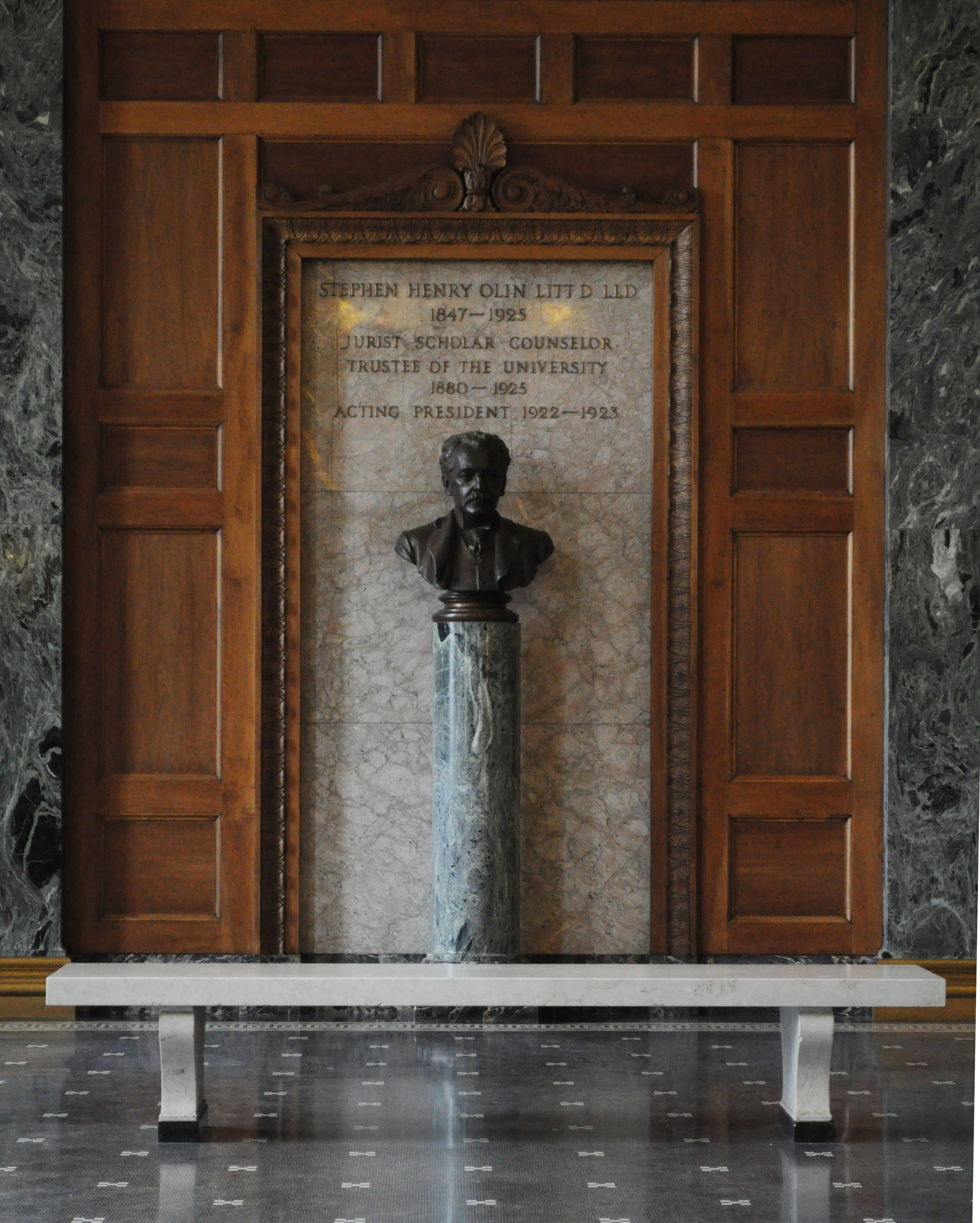
Bust of Stephen Henry Olin, lobby, Olin Library, Wesleyan University

Two years after graduating from Wesleyan, he began the practice of law in New York City, with the firms of Olin, Rives & Montgomery; Olin & Rives; and Olin, Clark & Phelps. He focused his practice on copyright law representing many of the eminent publishing companies in the United States.

For thirty years, Olin was a trustee of the New York Public Library, and before that, was a trustee of the Astor Library. He served as president of the University Settlement Society, vice president of the New York City Bar Association, and was a member of the New York National Guard, retiring in 1903 with the rank of colonel and chief of staff.

=== Wesleyan University ===
From 1922 to 1923, following the leave of absence, and eventual death, of president William A. Shanklin, Olin was asked and dutifully served as acting president of his alma mater, Wesleyan University, where his father had served as the second president and where he was a longtime trustee. (Note: Olin was the first trustee elected by the alumni and served as a trustee of Wesleyan University for 45 years.) In 1925, while in ill health, he traveled to Middletown, Connecticut, to witness the installation of President Dr. James L. McConaughy, who later served as Lt. Governor and Governor of Connecticut after he was president of the university.

Following his death, the University paid tribute to Olin with a memorial service at the college chapel presided by the president of the board of trustees.

=== Society life ===
In 1892, Olin was included in Ward McAllister's "Four Hundred", purported to be an index of New York's best families, published in The New York Times. Conveniently, 400 was the number of people that could fit into Mrs. Astor's ballroom. Olin was one of the founders of the Players Club, a member of the Society of Colonial Wars, the Century Club, the University Club, the City Club, and the Downtown Club.

== "Glenburn" ==
Glenburn was the Olin estate about three miles south of the village of Rhinebeck, New York. It was originally part of the Beekman patent.

In 1742 Judge Robert R. Livinston of Clermont, married Margaret, the only surviving child and heiress of Col. Henry Beekman of Rhinebeck. Their daughter Margaret (1749-1823) married Dr. Thomas Tillotson of Maryland on February 22, 1779. Between 1788 and 1790 he established a country place and called it "Linwood." Tillotson also obtained another part of the Beekman lands, twenty-nine acres of woodland lying east of Fallsburgh Creek, which passes through two beautiful waterfalls before reaching the Hudson River.

Tillotson's daughter Janette married Judge James Lynch. In 1830, Dr. Tillotson gave as a present to his twelve-year old granddaughter, Julia Lynch, the wooded gorge containing the waterfalls of Fallsburgh Creek. She called the place "Glenburn" and, when a new cottage had been built, it became her summer home and that of her parents. Julia Lynch was married to Rev. Stephen Olin at "Glenburn," in 1843, and returned there after her husband's death in 1851. At Mrs. Olin's death, in 1889, "Glenburn" descended to her son, Stephen Henry.

At one time the neighborhood had a post office of its own—the Glenburn post office, but this ceased when rural delivery service was established in Rhinebeck.

== Personal life ==
Olin married Alice Wadsworth Barlow (1853–1882), daughter of Samuel Latham Mitchill Barlow and Alice Cornell Townsend. Alice's brother was the lawyer and jurist Peter Townsend Barlow. Together, they were the parents of:

- Alice Townsend Olin (1881–1963), who married Tracy Dows (1871–1937) in 1903.
- Julia Lynch Olin (1882–1961), who married J. Philip Benkard in 1902. They divorced in 1920 and she married Lewis Stuyvesant Chanler, the former Lt. Gov. of New York in 1921.

After his wife's death in 1882 at the age of 29, he remarried to Emeline Harriman (1860–1938), the widow of William Earl Dodge III, in 1903. Emeline was the daughter of Oliver Harriman and the sister of Anne Harriman Vanderbilt, Oliver Harriman, Jr., J. Borden Harriman, and Herbert M. Harriman. Emeline had two children from her first marriage, William Earl Dodge IV, (Note: William Earl Dodge IV (1883–1927) was married to Jessie Sloane (1883–1968), daughter of Henry T. Sloane. They divorced and she remarried to George D. Widener Jr. (1889–1971).) and Annie Cleveland Dodge. (Note: Annie Cleveland Dodge (1880) was married to John H. McCullough.)

Olin died at his home, 400 Park Avenue in New York City on August 6, 1925, and his funeral was held at St. Thomas Church on Fifth Avenue. After his death, his widow remarried to Howland Spencer on December 15, 1931. They divorced in the spring of 1938, and she resumed using the Olin surname until her death in August 1938.

=== Legacy ===
The Olin Library at Wesleyan University was named after Olin and his father.
