= Augustus William Smith =

American educator, astronomer and mathematician

Augustus W. Smith

4th President of Wesleyan University
- In office 1852–1857
- Preceded by: Stephen Olin
- Succeeded by: Joseph Cummings

Personal details
- Born: Augustus William Smith; May 12, 1802 Newport, New York, United States
- Died: March 26, 1866 (aged 63) Annapolis, Maryland, United States
- Spouse: Catherine R. Childs (m. 1827)
- Education: Hamilton College (A.B., 1825)

Augustus William Smith (May 12, 1802 – March 26, 1866) was an American educator, astronomer and mathematician in the mid-19th century.

Smith was born in Newport, Herkimer County, New York, May 12, 1802. He attended Hamilton College, and graduated in 1825. After college, he began teaching in the Methodist Oneida conference seminary, in Cazenovia, New York. He became head of Oneida in 1827, the same year in which he married his wife, Catherine R. Childs. While at Oneida, he earned a master's degree from Hamilton.

At the founding of Wesleyan University in 1831, Smith was named professor of mathematics and astronomy in Wesleyan, and in 1851, Smith was elected president of the university. He received two LL.D. degrees, one in 1850 from Centenary College of Louisiana and another in the 1850s from Hamilton College.

Smith left Wesleyan in 1857, and from 1859 to 1866 he was professor of natural philosophy at the United States Naval Academy at Annapolis. In 1860, he was sent on the Labrador Eclipse Expedition, a United States government mission with a group of fellow astronomers to Labrador to observe the annular eclipse of the sun.

Smith was the author of several text books, including An Elementary Treatise on Mechanics, Embracing the Theory of Statics and Dynamics, and Its Application to Solids and Fluids.

He died at Annapolis, on March 26, 1866. One of his daughters, Helen Fairchild Smith, was the head of Wells College from 1894 to 1905.

Academic offices
| Preceded by Stephen Olin | President of Wesleyan University; 1852-1857 | Succeeded by Joseph Cummings |
