= Willbur Fisk =

American Methodist minister, educator and theologian

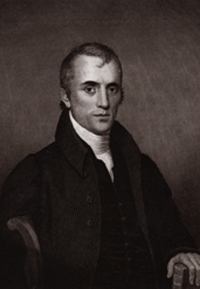

1st president of Wesleyan University
- In office 1831–1839
- Succeeded by: Stephen Olin

Personal details
- Born: August 31, 1792 Guilford, Vermont, US
- Died: February 22, 1839 (aged 46) Middletown, Connecticut, US

Willbur Fisk (Note: Fisk's first name is properly spelled with two Ls, as can be seen in his signatures, his grave marker, and the large hall on the Wesleyan campus named in his honor. However, numerous printed sources, including in his lifetime, give his name as Wilbur.) (August 31, 1792 – February 22, 1839) was a prominent American Methodist minister, educator and theologian. He was the first president of Wesleyan University.

== Family background ==
Fisk was born in Guilford, Vermont on August 31, 1792. His father, the Hon. Isaiah Fisk (1763–1859), was from Massachusetts and descended from William Fisk who emigrated to America from England in about 1637. His mother, Hannah (née Bacon, c. 1760–1845), was also from Massachusetts and was descended from John Bacon who came to America in 1640.

Isaiah and Hannah Fisk married on May 2, 1786, and moved to Guildford, where Isaiah's father, Amos Fisk, had purchased land at the outbreak of the American Revolution. Their first child, Isaiah Jr., was born in 1789, and died as a youngster in 1793. Polly, their second child, was born in Brattleboro in 1790. Willbur, their third child, was born two years later in 1792.

Unfortunate business interests caused a financial hardship for Isaiah and Hannah, and they moved with their children from Guilford to Lyndon, Vermont, in Caledonia County, about forty miles from the Canada–US border.

Isaiah Fisk became a respected citizen in Lyndon, and he was elected by his fellow citizens as assistant judge, Caledonia County Court from 1808 to 1813 and chief judge, Caledonia County Court from 1815 to 1823. He was also a presidential elector in the 1816 presidential election.

== Early life ==
Willbur Fisk was raised in Lyndon, and at age 16 he was admitted to the Peacham Academy in Vermont, where he completed a course of instruction in two years. After leaving the academy, he began attending Burlington College in Vermont in 1812 (now the University of Vermont). The outbreak of the War of 1812, however, caused classes to be suspended. He then transferred to Brown University in Providence, Rhode Island, in 1814 and graduated in 1815.

While at Brown he determined to pursue a career in law, and upon graduation returned to Lyndon where he began working at the law office of the Hon. Isaac Fletcher. Fisk was not known as a particularly devoted student while in college, but after a year or so decided that a career in law was at odds with his Christian character. He left the legal profession behind and moved to Baltimore where he was engaged as a tutor.

Fisk was plagued by respiratory problems throughout his life, and ill health in Baltimore caused him to move back home to Lyndon to recuperate. While in Lyndon, he came in contact with the great religious revival sweeping the state of Vermont. His mother, Hannah, had forsaken her New England Calvinist roots to become a Methodist, and her home was a center of Methodist activity in northern Vermont. After much contemplation, Fisk decided to become a Methodist minister and was appointed an itinerant minister in the Methodist Episcopal Church in 1818. His influence with the conference reversed its opinion from principled opposition to higher education to the establishment of secondary schools and colleges.

Fisk only served as a minister for three years in Vermont and Massachusetts before becoming interested in furthering educational opportunities in New England. In about 1820 he suffered a relapse in his health and did not resume his preaching until about 1822.

== Wesleyan Academy and Wesleyan University ==
While still engaged in his ministerial duties, Fisk became actively involved with the New Market Academy in New Market, New Hampshire, (Note: Where the academy was originally located is now part of Newfields, New Hampshire.) and in 1824 was appointed to the board of trustees. When it was relocated to Wilbraham, Massachusetts (and renamed the Wilbraham Wesleyan Academy), he was appointed to the position of principal in 1826. The success of the Academy under his direction was noted by many Methodists, and he was then offered the presidency of the new Wesleyan University which was being established in Middletown, Connecticut. He accepted that position and remained as its first president from its opening in 1831 until his death in 1839. As an indication of the high esteem with which he was regarded by his contemporaries, he was elected to the office of Bishop in 1835, which he declined to devote his energies to educational matters. In 1851, Wesleyan Academy (now Wilbraham & Monson Academy) erected Fisk Hall in his honor.

Under his leadership the university became an important center for Methodist education in New England. Many of his ideas were regarded as unusual in his day: admission was not dependent on religious affiliation, he encouraged the "bodily health" of students, and he regarded modern languages as being as important as classical languages. His views may be summed up with this quote from his writings: "The great object which we propose to ourselves in the work of education is to supply, as far as we may, men who will be willing and competent to effect the political, intellectual, and spiritual regeneration of the world." To that end, he worked to insure the physical, moral and intellectual developments of his students.

== European travel ==
In 1835, Fisk suffered another relapse in his battle with what appears to have been some sort of chronic respiratory disease. His physician advised him to take a sea voyage to try to regain his health. The trustees of the Wesleyan University were anxious for him to make a complete recovery and offered to let him take a year off to travel to Europe to acquire books and laboratory equipment for the university. Willbur and Ruth left New York in the company of a faculty member and friend, Wilbur B. Lane, in 1835. Before their departure in 1835 the Board of Fellows of Brown University awarded him a Doctor of Divinity degree.

While in England, Fisk gave many sermons, and throughout his trip he was actively engaged in carrying out his assignment of acquiring supplies for the university. In addition to sightseeing, the European tour proved to be quite strenuous for his frail constitution. His health did improve, however, and after he returned to Middletown in 1836, he resumed his duties as president of the university. In 1838 Harper's published his book describing the European tour: Travels On The Continent Of Europe; Viz., In England, Ireland, Scotland, France, Italy, Switzerland, Germany, And The Netherlands.

== Slavery, temperance and Indian missions ==
The question of slavery was one of the burning issues of the day, and one that often put Willbur Fisk at odds with many of his fellow Methodists. He was a colonizationist who favored sending America's slaves to Africa. He opposed the abolitionists within the church who sought to deny membership to any slaveholder or any supporter of slavery. Willbur felt that the abolitionist approach would split the church and prevent those who needed Christian love and teachings the most from receiving it. He endorsed what he believed was a truly Christian, non-violent way of solving this social evil. Many felt his approach would not bring about emancipation. Toward the end of his life he regretted some of his arguments, but still stood on the principle that a unified church was the quickest way to emancipate slaves. Whether his way would have worked is open to debate, however, in one sense he was correct—in 1844 the Methodist church did split along exactly the lines that he predicted, and only twenty years after his death the nation was plunged into war as the time for talking about slavery ended.

Fisk was an early advocate for temperance throughout the 1830s and often wrote and lectured on the "evils of alcohol." He believed that a person should abstain entirely and felt that "drinking rum and going to hell are synonymous terms."

Fisk was instrumental in securing funds for a translation of the Bible into the Mohawk language in 1831 (the project was completed in 1839).

== Marriage and family ==
Fisk most likely met his wife, Ruth Peck of Providence, at some point while he was in Rhode Island. They carried on a seven-year engagement, primarily through correspondence, until they decided to marry on June 9, 1823, in Providence. She was an Episcopalian prior to her marriage. Prentice indicates that most friends believed that Willbur and Ruth had an unhappy marriage, and her letters indicate dissatisfaction with her ability to have a harmonious relationship. Willbur expected to outlive his wife, and did not prepare adequately for his early demise. He expressed concern for Ruth's continuing welfare on his deathbed. In an expression of true friendship and Christian charity, faculty members and students of Wesleyan University helped Ruth for the remainder of her life. She lived in poverty in a small house on Foss Hill, near Foss House, (the house was later moved to the lower Union Street section of Middletown, where it was demolished in the 1960s).

The Fisks adopted a daughter, Martha S. Fisk, who was born on October 24, 1824. She lived with her parents in Middletown and then with her mother and grandmother, Lydia Peck, after her father's death in 1839. Martha died at age twenty on April 25, 1844, in Middletown. She is buried in the Wesleyan Cemetery (on campus).

Ruth's mother, Lydia (Lyon) Peck was born May 9, 1769, in West Woodstock, Connecticut, and came to live with Willbur and Ruth in her old age. She is mentioned in Prentice's biography (though not by her first name) as living with them in Middletown. Lydia was the daughter of Amos Lyon (1733–1812). She died on June 25, 1843, in Middletown, and is buried in the Wesleyan Cemetery.

Willbur Fisk died after a long, painful illness in Middletown on February 22, 1839, with his wife by his side. He is buried in the Wesleyan Cemetery.

Wilbur Wright was named after him.

== Bibliography ==
This is a partial bibliography of works by and about Willbur Fisk. Also see entries in the Dictionary of American Biography, the Encyclopædia Britannica, as well as many Methodist histories.

- Bangs, Nathan, A discourse on occasion of the death of the Reverend Wilbur Fisk, D.D., president of the Wesleyan University: Delivered in the Greene-Street Church, New-York, on the evening of the 29th of March 1839, NY: T. Mason & G. Lane, 1839, 24 p.
- Bangs, Nathan, A History of the Methodist Episcopal Church, NY, T. Mason and G. Lane, 1839, 3rd edition, 4 volumes (see volume four)
- Fisk, Wilbur, Travels On The Continent Of Europe; Viz., In England, Ireland, Scotland, France, Italy, Switzerland, Germany, And The Netherlands, NY: Harper's, 1838, 688 p.
- Fisk, Wilbur, Calvinistic Controversy: Embracing a Sermon on Predestination and Election; and Several Numbers on the Same Subject,..., New York: B. Waugh and T. Mason, 1835, 273 p.

[Articles originally published in The Christian Advocate and Journal]

- Holdich, Joseph, The Life of Wilbur Fisk, D.D., First President of Wesleyan University, NY: Harper, 1842, 455 p.
- Pierce, Frederick C., Fiske and Fisk Family, Chicago: Published by the Author, 1896
- Prentice, George, Wilbur Fisk, Boston: Houghton, Mifflin Co., 1889, 289 p. (American Religious Leaders Series)
- Vermont Historical Magazine, No XI, October 1867, pp. 348–349

== Notes ==
Academic offices
Preceded by Office created	President of Wesleyan University; 1831-1839	Succeeded by Nathan Bangs
