= Nathan Bangs =

American Methodist theologian (1778–1862)

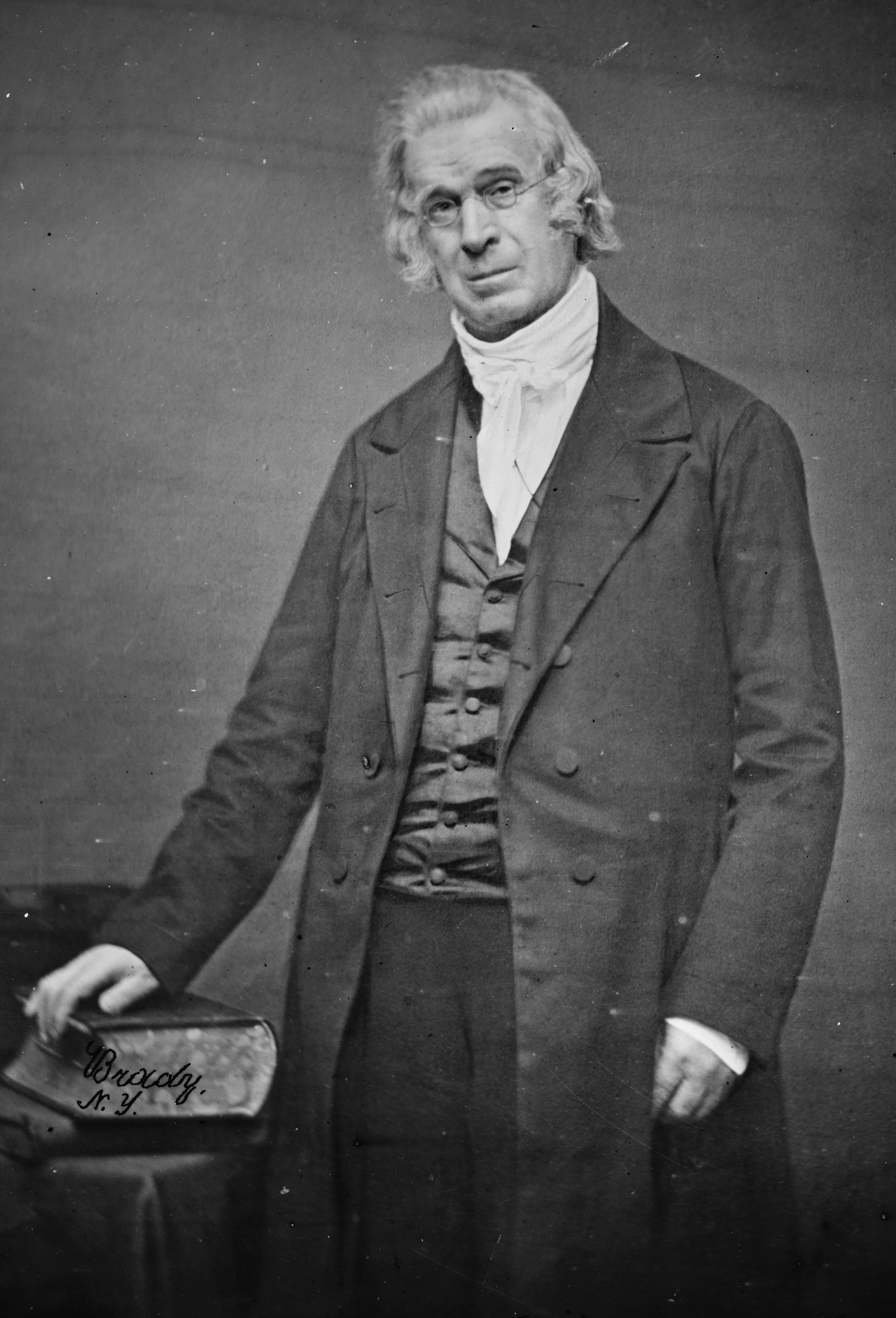
Nathan Bangs

Nathan Bangs (2 May 1778 – 3 May 1862) was an American Christian theologian in the Methodist tradition and influential leader in the Methodist Episcopal Church prior to the 1860s.

Born in Stratford, Connecticut, he received a limited education, taught school, and in 1799 went to Upper Canada in search of work as either a teacher or a land-surveyor. He was converted to Methodism in 1800 and worked for eight years as an itinerant preacher in the wilderness of the Canadian provinces, serving communities in the areas of Kingston, York, London, Niagara, and Montreal. Of particular note is his responsibility for organizing the first camp meeting in Upper Canada in the fall of 1805. That same year, he married Canadian Mary Bolton and, after a brief stint in Lower Canada, was transferred back to the United States in 1808, first in Albany and then New York in 1810. In 1812, Bangs was made the Presiding Elder of the Lower Canada District, also riding the Montreal Circuit. Bangs was esteemed within the church, and could have requested and received a much more pleasant assignment. However, with war brewing between Britain and America, few riders would volunteer for assignment to Canada, and Bishop Asbury would not assign non-volunteers. Bangs volunteered to be assigned to Canada, as there was a desperate need for volunteers. The war prevented Bangs from reaching his assignment, however, and Bangs instead was made Presiding Elder of the Croton Circuit in Delaware, while Thomas Burch went to the Montreal Circuit instead. In subsequent years, he took a prominent part in the councils of the church.

In 1820, he was transferred from a pastorate in New York to become the Senior Book Agent of the Methodist Book Concern. Although the Concern was first founded in 1798 under John Dickins, it was under Bangs's tenure that the establishment was provided with its first press, bindery, official premises, and weekly newspaper. All of this helped Bangs to pay off the Concern's debts while he also served as the first editor of the Methodist Magazine. In 1828 he was appointed editor of the Christian Advocate (though he had been functioning as its unofficial editor since its inception in 1826). When the Methodist Quarterly Review replaced the Methodist Magazine in 1832, the General Conference continued Bangs in the editorship.

Bangs was the principal founder and secretary of the Methodist missionary society. When appointed secretary of the missionary society in 1836, he devoted his chief energies to its service, until appointed president of the Wesleyan University, at Middletown, Connecticut, in 1841. Surprisingly, that proved to be a disappointment to everyone and in 1842 Bangs resumed pastoral work in New York, and in 1852 retired and employed himself during his remaining years chiefly in literary labors. Although his career was an illustrious one, Bangs's reputation suffered badly when he failed to support Methodist abolitionists at the General Conference of 1844. Abel Stevens published a lengthy biography of Bangs one year after his death in 1862.

Bangs defended Arminianism against the Calvinism of his day. He was a strong believer of prevenient grace but not at the expense of total depravity. He argued that because of grace, humankind does have the ability to respond to God. He also opposed the antinomianism practiced by some rival members of the New Light Baptist community.

His most important work was a History of the Methodist Episcopal Church from its Origin in 1776 to the General Conference of 1840 (4 volumes, New York, 1839–42). His other published works were a volume directed against Christianism, a new sect in New England (1809); Errors of Hopkinsianism (1815); Predestination Examined (1817); Reformer Reformed (1818); Methodist Episcopacy (1820); Letters to Young Ministers of the Gospel (1826); Life of the Rev. Freeborn Garrettson (1829); Authentic History of the Missions Under the Care of the Methodist Episcopal Church (1832); The Original Church of Christ (1836); Essay on Emancipation (1848); State and Responsibilities of the Methodist Episcopal Church (1850); Letters on Sanctification (1851); a Life of Arminius; Scriptural Vindication of the Orders and Powers of the Ministry of the Methodist Episcopal Church; and numerous sermons.

== Resources ==
Biography

- Biography at the Dictionary of Canadian Biography Online
- "Bangs, Nathan". The Biographical Dictionary of America. Vol. 1. 1906. p. 205.

Sources

- Works by or about Nathan Bangs at the Internet Archive
- Online works of Nathan Bangs
- Journals of Nathan Bangs 1805-6, 1817

Bibliography

- Practical Divinity: Theology in tho Wesleyan Tradition (1982) by Thomas A. Langford, chapter 4: "The Americanization of Wesleyan Theology", (ISBN 0-687-07382-0)
- Rawlyk, George. The Canada Fire: Radical Evangelicalism in British North America, 1775-1812. McGill-Queen's UP, 1994.
- Carroll, John (1867). Case and his cotemporaries [sic], or, The Canadian itinerants' memorial constituting a biographical history of Methodism in Canada, from its introduction into the Province, till the death of the Rev. Wm. Case in 1855. Vol. I. Toronto: Wesleyan Conference Office.
- Warriner, Edwin (1885). Old Sands Street Methodist Episcopal Church, of Brooklyn, N.Y.: An Illustrated Centennial Record, Historical and Biographical. Phillips & Hunt.

Academic offices
Preceded by Willbur Fisk	President of Wesleyan University; 1841–1842	Succeeded by Stephen Olin
