= USS Sabalo (SP-225) =

Patrol vessel of the United States Navy

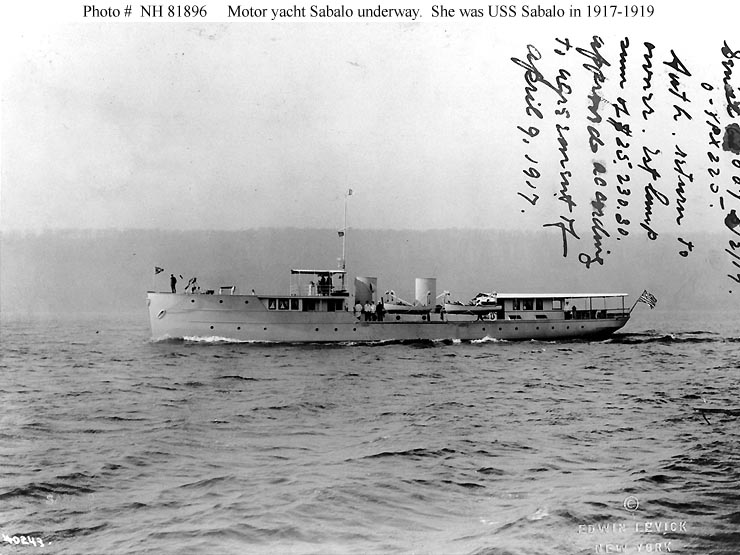
- Sabalo in use as a civilian yacht in 1916, prior to her U.S. Navy service.

History

United States
- Name: USS Sabalo
- Namesake: The sabalo, another name for the tarpon, a large, silvery game fish of the herring group, found in the warmer parts of the western Atlantic Ocean (Previous name retained)
- Builder: George Lawley and Sons, Neponset, Massachusetts
- Completed: 1916
- Acquired: 11 May 1917
- Commissioned: 20 July 1917
- Decommissioned: 3 March 1919
- Identification: SP-225
- Fate: Returned to owner 3 March 1919
- Notes: Operated as civilian yacht Sabalo 1916–1917 and 1919–1931 and as Breezin' Thru 1931–1940

Canada
- Name: Cougar
- Namesake: The cougar, a large, solitary cat native to the Americas
- Acquired: 1940
- Commissioned: 11 September 1940
- Decommissioned: 23 November 1945
- Identification: Pennant number: Z 15
- Fate: Returned to owner 1946; sank September 1950
- Notes: Breezin' Thru 1946–1950

General characteristics
- Type: Patrol vessel
- Tonnage: 204 GRT
- Length: 141 ft (43 m)
- Beam: 19 ft 6 in (5.94 m)
- Draft: 7 ft (2.1 m) mean
- Speed: 14 kn (26 km/h; 16 mph)
- Complement: 12
- Armament: 2 × 3-pounder guns; 1 × 6-pounder with Royal Canadian Navy

The first USS Sabalo (SP-225) was a United States Navy patrol vessel in commission from 1917 to 1919. Following World War I, Sabalo was sold to private interests before returning to service as a patrol vessel in World War II, this time with the Royal Canadian Navy, renamed Cougar. Returning to private ownership following the war, the vessel sank in a hurricane in 1950.

== Description ==
Sabalo had a gross register tonnage (GRT) of 204. The vessel was 141 ft (43 m) long overall with a beam of 19 ft 6 in (5.94 m) and a draft of 7 ft (2.1 m). The ship had a speed of 14 knots (26 km/h; 16 mph) and in U.S. Navy service was equipped with two 3-pounder guns and machine guns. In U.S. service Sabalo had a complement of 12.

== Service history ==
=== Construction and US Navy career ===
Sabalo was built as a civilian motor yacht in 1916 by George Lawley and Sons at Neponset, Massachusetts for W. Earl Dodge of New York City, a local financier. The U.S. Navy acquired her from her owner for $25,230 on 11 May 1917 for World War I service as a patrol vessel. She was commissioned on 20 July 1917 as USS Sabalo (SP-225). Assigned to the 3rd Naval District, Sabalo operated in the New York Harbor area on section patrol duty for the remainder of World War I. On 1 October 1917, she joined the patrol vessel USS Mohican in coming to the assistance of the sinking patrol vessel USS Mohawk, which had collided with the British tanker Vennacher off Sandy Hook, New Jersey, and she and Mohican rescued all 77 members of Mohawk's crew. Sabalo was decommissioned on 3 March 1919 and returned to Dodge the same day.

=== Interwar ===
Dodge kept Sabalo in use as a pleasure yacht until 1921, when he sold her to Van Lear Black of Baltimore, Maryland. Franklin Roosevelt piloted the yacht as a guest of Black. Black fell to his death off the aft deck in 1930. Black's estate in turn sold her in 1931 to the Albert Pack Corporation of Chicago, Illinois, which renamed her Breezin' Thru. In 1937, Leila Y. Post Montgomery of Battle Creek, Michigan, bought Breezin' Thru.

=== Royal Canadian Navy and postwar service ===
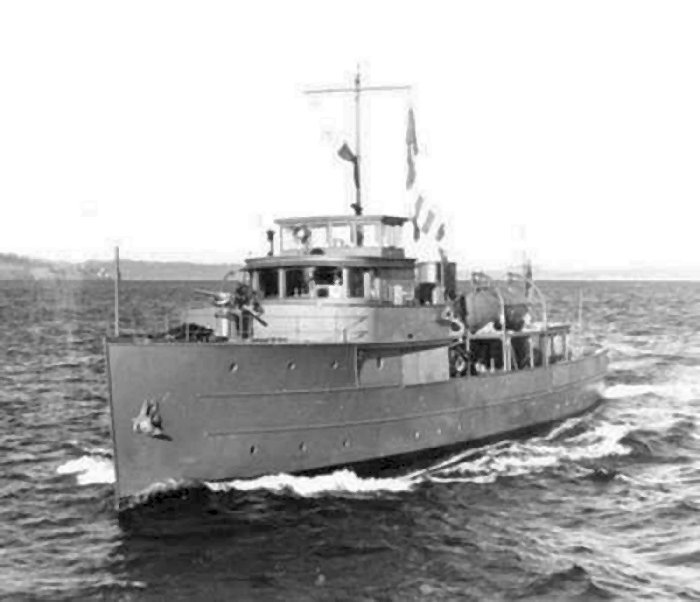
HMCS Cougar sometime between 1940 and 1945.

After failing to acquire any British vessels at the beginning of World War II for auxiliary purposes, the Royal Canadian Navy discreetly searched the American market for suitable ships. However, American law prevented the sale of ships for possible use in the war to any of the belligerents. The Royal Canadian Navy requisitioned unsuitable Canadian yachts and had their respective owners go the United States and buy those ships the Navy wanted as replacements. Once the ships arrived in Canada, the navy then returned the original yachts and requisitioned the new ones. The Royal Canadian Navy acquired Breezin' Thru in 1940 after she was purchased by Clarence Wallace, the president of Burrard Dry Dock. Breezin Thru had not been Wallace's designated target vessel in the United States, but the shipbroker suggested the yacht after the Royal Canadian Navy's selection was found to be in a poor state.

Once the vessel had arrived on the West Coast of Canada, Wallace used the vessel himself for a couple of weeks to maintain the illusion that Breezin Thru had not been purchased for military purposes. She was rearmed with one 6-pounder gun at the bow. The ship was renamed Cougar and commissioned into the Royal Canadian Navy on 11 September 1940 with the pennant number Z 15. In Canadian service, the vessel had a complement of 5 officers and 35 crew. After commissioning, Cougar had a quiet career on the west coast, initially placed on antisubmarine patrol out of Esquimalt, British Columbia. In May 1942 she was transferred to Prince Rupert Force, based at Prince Rupert, British Columbia. She returned to Esquimalt in June 1944, where she served as an examination vessel. The vessel was paid off on 23 November 1945 and sold to American interests in 1946.

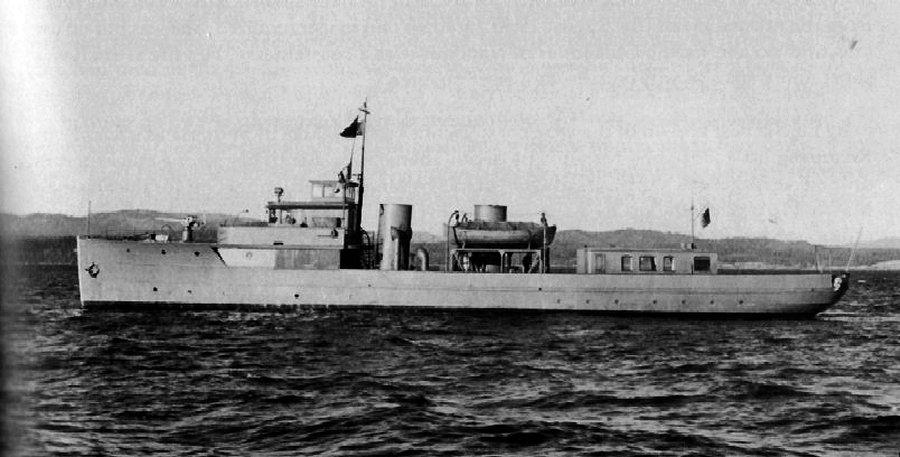
HMCS Cougar in the Strait of Juan de Fuca, ca. December 1940.

Once again named Breezin' Thru, she operated as a pleasure yacht until sunk during a hurricane at Kingston, Jamaica, in September 1950.
