= Peter Townsend Barlow =

American lawyer

- Born: July 21, 1857; New York City, New York, United States
- Died: May 9, 1921 (aged 63); Chicago, Illinois, United States
- Education: Harvard College; Columbia Law School
- Occupations: Lawyer, New York City Magistrate
- Spouse: Virginia Louise Matthews (after 1886)
- Children: Edward Matthews Barlow; Samuel Latham Mitchell Barlow II
- Parent(s): Samuel L. M. Barlow; Alice Cornell Townsend

Peter Townsend Barlow (July 21, 1857 – May 9, 1921) was an American jurist who served as a New York City Magistrate for nearly two decades.

== Early life ==
Peter T. Barlow was born at New York City to Samuel Latham Mitchell Barlow (1826–1889) and the former Alice Cornell Townsend (1833–1889). His father was a prominent New York Wall Street attorney who frequently represented the interest of the American railroad industry. Barlow’s grandfather was Samuel Bancroft Barlow, a noted American physician. Barlow's sister, Alice Wadsworth Barlow, was married to Stephen Henry Olin, a lawyer who served as the acting president of Wesleyan University. Barlow's niece, Julia Lynch Olin, was married to Lewis Stuyvesant Chanler, the former Lt. Gov. of New York.

Barlow attended Harvard College and graduated with the Class of 1879; receiving his law degree two years later from Columbia Law School.

== Career ==
After his admittance to the New York Bar, Barlow became managing clerk for his father's law firm, Shipman, Barlow, Larocque & Choate. Barlow left the firm not long after the death of his father in 1889.

In 1895, Barlow was elected to the Board of Directors of the Sterling Mountain Railway Co. and in 1902 was chosen by New York Mayor Seth Low to fill out the term of City Magistrate Willard H. Olmstead after the latter’s appointed to the Court of Special Sessions. Though he still had some years left on his appointment, the following year, Mayor Low named Barlow to a full ten-year term as magistrate. Barlow went on to be reappointed to a second ten-year term by Mayor William Jay Gaynor and serve as president of the Board of City Magistrates for three terms. For a number of years Barlow presided over the Women’s Night Court located in Lower Manhattan, and as president of the Florence Crittenton League, a reformatory primarily for prostitutes and unwed mothers. Peter T. Barlow often chose to sentence women convicted of prostitution or petty thefts to workhouses or reformatories in the belief that it would weaken their ties with the men who controlled them.

=== Poillon sisters ===
Katherine and Charlotte Poillon were sisters from Troy, New York who over several decades made headlines with their frequent lawsuits against wealthy men or fending off charges of failing to pay their debts. In 1902, Katherine Poillon filled a $250,000 breach of promise lawsuit against wealthy sportsman William Gould Brokaw, a cousin of Irving Brokaw and later settled out of court for $17,500. Peter Barlow fell into their web in 1908 when the sisters were arrested for failing to pay several New York City hotels bills amounting to over $500. During the trial Katherine made the claim that Judge Barlow borrowed $25,000 from her and had promised to pay her hotel bills as partial payment. Later Barlow took the stand and denied her allegations, but did admit that some years earlier he had been introduced to the sisters. In an outburst during court Katherine declared their relationship had been personal and ongoing for a number of years. The Poillon sisters were eventually found guilty by the court and sent to a jail on Blackwell Island for three months.

== Personal life ==
On May 6, 1886, Barlow married Virginia Louise Matthews (1858–1905) at ceremony performed in Paris, France. She was the daughter of Edward Mathews, a prominent merchant, and a sister of author Brander Matthews. Over the years of their marriage, Peter and Virginia's names frequently made the society pages in New York newspapers. The couple went on to be the parents of two sons:

- Edward Matthews Barlow (1889–1901), who died at the age of thirteen on April 21, 1901
- Samuel Latham Mitchell Barlow II (1892–1982), a Harvard educated pianist and composer.

Barlow’s health began to decline about midway through his second full term in office; he spent most of 1918 on paid medical leave. After a brief recovery he went back on medical leave that December, never to return to the bench again. Peter Barlow spent the winter of 1920–21 under the care of a nurse at Coronado, California and took ill on their train ride home; dying some ten days later on May 9, 1921, at St. Luke’s Hospital in Chicago, Illinois. Virginia Barlow preceded her husband in death on April 24, 1905, after struggling with heart disease. Peter and his wife are both interred at the Green-Wood Cemetery in Brooklyn, New York.
