= Julia Lynch Olin =

American author and Baháʼí (1882–1961)

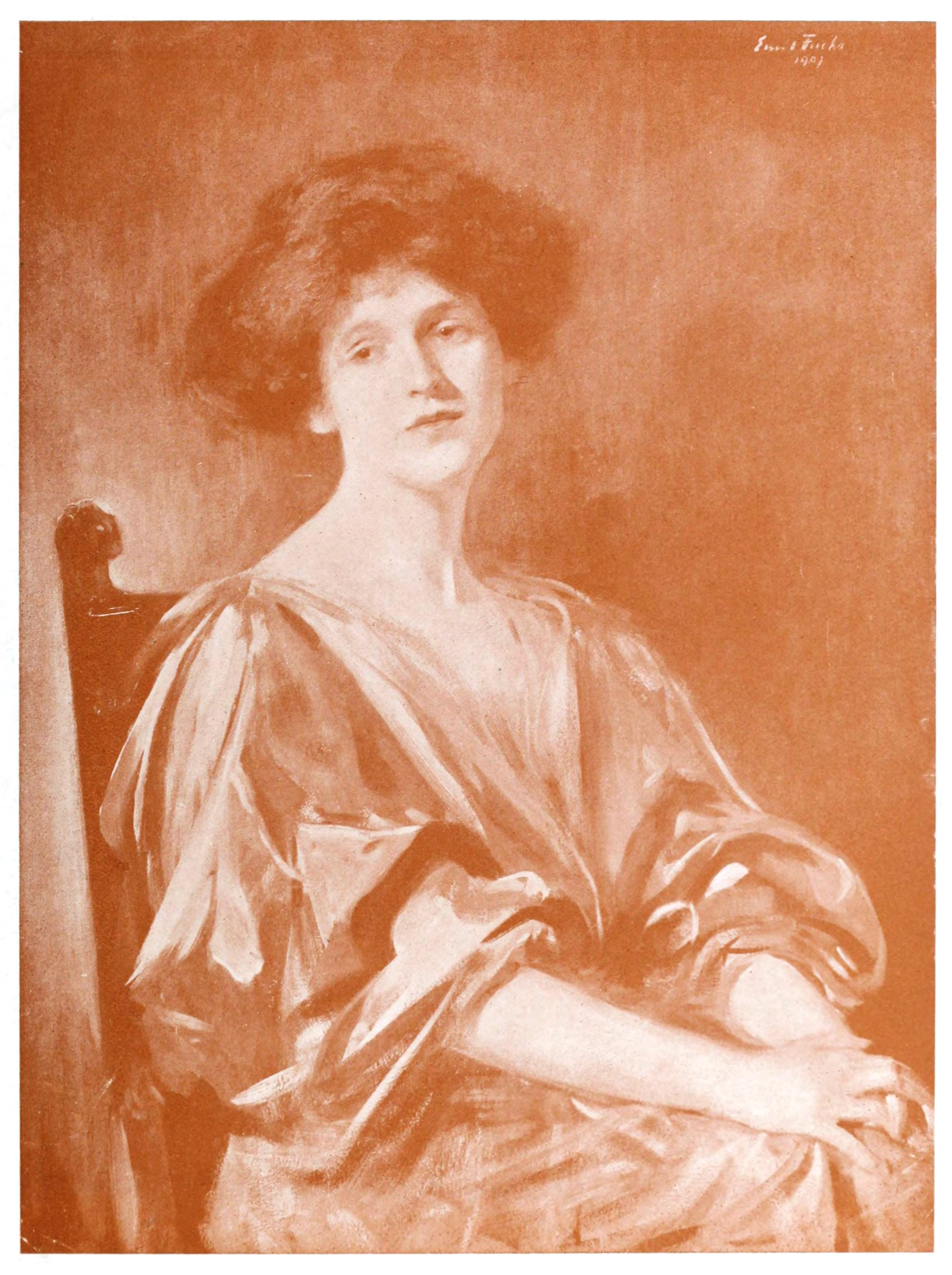
- Portrait of Mrs Phil Benkard, by Emil Fuchs
- Born: October 21, 1882; Glen Clove, New York
- Died: March 11, 1961 (aged 78); New York City, New York
- Spouses: J. Philip Benkard (m. 1902; div. 1920) Lewis Stuyvesant Chanler (m. 1921; died 1942)
- Parent(s): Stephen Henry Olin; Alice Wadsworth Barlow
- Relatives: Stephen Olin (grandfather); Alice Olin Dows (sister)

Julia Lynch Olin (October 21, 1882 – March 11, 1961) was an American author and Baháʼí who co-founded the New History Society in New York City, and was later expelled from the religion by Shoghi Effendi around 1939. Through marriage, she was a member of the Astor and Dudley–Winthrop families.

== Early life ==
Olin was born on October 21, 1882, in Glen Cove, New York. She was the daughter of Stephen Henry Olin (1847–1925), the acting President of Wesleyan University from 1922 to 1923, and Alice Wadsworth Barlow (1853–1882). Her sister was Alice Townsend Olin (1881–1963), who married Tracy Dows (1871–1937) in 1903. After her mother's death in 1882 at the age of 29, her father remarried to Emeline Harriman (1860–1938), the former wife of William Earl Dodge III, in 1903. Emeline was the daughter of Oliver Harriman and the sister of Anne Harriman Vanderbilt, Oliver Harriman, Jr., J. Borden Harriman, and Herbert M. Harriman.

Her maternal grandparents were Samuel Latham Mitchill Barlow (1826–1889) and Alice Cornell Townsend (1833–1889). Her paternal grandparents were Julia Matilda Lynch Olin (1814–1879) and Rev. Dr. Stephen Olin (1797–1851), 2nd President of Wesleyan University and the son of Henry Olin (1768–1837), a member of the U.S. House of Representatives from Vermont.

== Baháʼí Faith ==
Olin was first introduced to the teachings of the Baháʼí Faith about 1925, as she states in her autobiography. Becoming intimately associated with Mirza Ahmad Sohrab they together with her second husband, Lewis Stuyvesant Chanler, started the New History Society. This Society, based in the home that Olin and Lewis owned in New York, (later called Caravan House), published several books, into the late 1950s. It apparently became defunct after Sohrab and/or Olin had died.

In 1929, he and Olin formed an educational organization called Caravan of East and West with a quarterly magazine called The Caravan. This magazine is where Sohrab's partial autobiography first appeared, also in 1929.

Also that year, an article appeared in which the engagement of her daughter Elsie Benkard to Charles H. Clarke was announced. The marriage announcement appeared on February 27, 1930, stating that "...they were married with a Bahai ceremony. It was the first time that such a ceremony ... has been used at a society wedding in New York. Mirza Ahmad Sohrab officiated."

The New History Society was addressed by several prominent intellectuals, including Albert Einstein in 1930. Another speaker was Margaret Sanger in January 1932. In 1934, she described Baha'i membership as: "To be a Baha'i simply means to love all the world; to love humanity and try to serve it; to work for universal peace and universal brotherhood." In 1936, Julia translated the French version of Seven Valleys into English.

=== Expulsion ===
She was expelled from the Baháʼí community in 1939 along with Lewis and Sohrab after they refused to allow the Local Spiritual Assembly of New York oversight over the operations of the New History Society. They went on to support the efforts of Mírzá Muhammad ʻAlí, and at one point petitioned the President of Israel for Muhammad ʻAlí's property rights when he tried to assert his control over the Shrine of Baháʼu'lláh.

As part of its mission, the New History Society, for many years sponsored an essay-contest. At least one of the winners of this, Jaja Wachuku, became famous in his own right, for his essay "How Can the People of the World Achieve Universal Disarmament?" written while at the New Africa University College.

== Personal life ==
On December 11, 1902, Olin married John Philip Benkard (1872–1929) of New York City, a financier and the son of James Benkard. Before their divorce in December 1920, they had two daughters:

- Phyllis Benkard, who died of meningitis, aged 24, in Paris in 1928.
- Elsie Benkard, who married Charles Harold Clarke and lived in Oyster Bay, New York, in 1930.

On May 23, 1921, she married Lewis Stuyvesant Chanler (1869–1942), the ex-Lieutenant Governor of New York and a former Democratic candidate for Governor, in Paris. He was the fifth son of John Winthrop Chanler and Margaret Astor Ward and a great-great-grandson of the first John Jacob Astor.

She is said to have donated her fortune for the Baha'i faith. Julia died on March 11, 1961, at the age of 78. In her obituary she was described as "spiritual leader of the Reform Baha'i movement..."

== Works ==
- Living Pictures. In the Great Drama of the 19th Century. (with Ahmad Sohrab) New York: The New History Society, 1933. Reprinted. H-Bahai: Lansing, Michigan, 2004. (this link includes her picture)
- Seven Valleys, by Baháʼu'lláh (trans. Julie Chanler), 1936
- Brand, & Sohrab [libretto Max Brand, and Julie Chandler; Music Max Brand]. The Gate: Scenic Oratorio for Soli, Chorus, and Orchestra in Two Parts (19 Scenes). 61. New York: Associated Music Publishers, 1944.
- His Messengers Went Forth, by Julie Chanler, Illustrated by Olin Dows. Published by Coward-McCann, Inc. New York. Copyright 1948.
- Ioas, Chanler, & Sohrab. Three Letters. 11 leaves. New York: Caravan of East and West, 1954.
- From Gaslight to Dawn, New History Foundation, NY 1956

== See also ==
- Baháʼí divisions
- Ruth White (Baháʼí author)
- List of excommunicated Baháʼís
