= USS Mohican (SP-117) =

Patrol vessel of the United States Navy

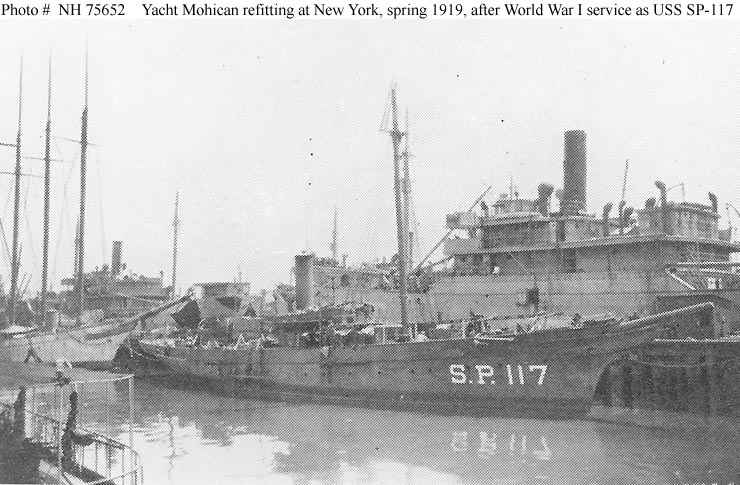
- USS SP-117, formerly USS Mohican (SP-117), refitting at Tebo's Yacht Works in Brooklyn, New York in the spring of 1919 after decommissioning there in February 1919.

History

United States
- Name: USS Mohican
- Namesake: Mohicans (previous name retained)
- Port of registry: New York
- Builder: Laird Brothers, Birkenhead
- Launched: 1890
- Completed: 1890
- Acquired: 19 April 1917
- Commissioned: 7 June 1917
- Decommissioned: 15 February 1919
- Renamed: USS SP-117 April 1918
- Fate: Returned to owner 17 February 1919
- Notes: Operated as private yacht Norseman, Lady Godiva and Mohican 1890-1917 and as Mohican from 1919. Then Waluchia II, Apache. WW2 service with Royal Navy as Inquisitor and in 1947 registered as Ourania

General characteristics
- Class & type: Aux steam yacht
- Type: Patrol vessel
- Tonnage: 231 GRT, 157 NRT
- Length: 144 ft (44 m) overall; 138.6 ft (42.2 m) registered
- Beam: 23.0 ft (7.0 m)
- Draft: 14 ft 6 in (4.42 m)
- Depth: 13.35 ft (4.07 m)
- Installed power: 53 NHP
- Propulsion: 1 × triple-expansion engine; 1 × screw
- Speed: 8.6 knots
- Complement: 48
- Armament: 1 × 3-inch (76.2-millimeter) guns; 2 × 6-pounder guns; 2 × machine guns
- Aircraft carried: 1 × observation balloon (kite balloon) from August 1918

The third USS Mohican (SP-117), later USS SP-117, was an armed yacht that served in the United States Navy as a patrol vessel from 1917 to 1919.

== History ==
As the Lady Godiva (right), racing the Aloha off Oyster Bay, Long Island, on 29 June 1901; photograph by James Burton in Forest and Stream

Mohican was designed by St Clare John Byrne, built as the civilian steam yacht Norseman and launched in 1890 by Laird Brothers in Birkenhead, Wirral, for Engineer Samuel Radcliffe Platt. When sold by Platt, she was renamed SS Lady Godiva and later when purchased by New Yorker Tracy Dows he named her Mohican. Oliver and J. Borden Harriman purchased her from Tracy Dows in October 1905.

As the Norseman she had already made history in Britain: her first owner, Samuel Radcliffe Platt of Oldham, was a director of the Manchester Ship Canal Company, and she was the first vessel of any size to enter the canal, through the Eastham locks in June 1891, and led the procession of ships that opened it on 1 January 1894 with the company's directors on board. By 1900 she had been sold to Cyril C. H. Potter of Liverpool and renamed Lady Godiva.

=== US Navy ===
The US Navy acquired Mohican on a free lease from her next owner, Robert Perkins of New York City, on 19 April 1917 for use as a patrol boat during World War I. She was commissioned at New York City on 7 June 1917 as USS Mohican (SP-117).

Mohican was assigned to the 3rd Naval District as guard boat on 1 July 1917. She engaged in patrol and escort duty in New York Harbor and off New York City until 21 August 1918, at times directing the heavy maritime traffic in Lower New York Bay and at others aiding vessels in distress due to fire or collision. On 1 October 1917, she joined the patrol boat USS Sabalo (SP-225) in coming to the assistance of the sinking patrol vessel USS Mohawk, which had collided with the British tanker Vennacher off Sandy Hook, New Jersey, and she and Sabalo rescued all 77 members of Mohawk′s crew. Mohican was renamed USS SP-117 in April 1918 to avoid confusion with another Navy ship of the same name, the sloop-of-war USS Mohican.

On 23 August 1918, SP-117 took on board an air observation balloon and aviators and began observation kite balloon duty at the entrance to New York Harbor and Ambrose Channel. She remained on this duty through 25 November 1918 and then, following repairs, departed on 14 December 1918 to assume guard boat and kite balloon duty at Gravesend Bay, Long Island, New York.

=== Decommissioned ===
SP-117 ceased operations on 17 January 1919 and on 15 February 1919 was decommissioned at Tebo's Yacht Basin at Brooklyn, New York. The Navy returned her to her owner on 17 February 1919.

In 1925 Lloyd's Register of Yachts listed her under the ownership of the Montreal industrialist and banker Sir Charles Blair Gordon, who sold her the same year to H. D. Walbridge of New York, for whom she became Walucia II; after passing through further hands as Apache and, once more, Norseman, she was bought back by Gordon in 1931, registered at Glasgow, and kept by him for cruising on the west coast of Scotland until his death in 1939.

Norseman, later Mohican - first vessel to navigate the Manchester Ship Canal when opened in 1894
