= Stuyvesant family =

Family of American politicians and landowners in New York City

Stuyvesant
- Current region: New York City
- Origin: Netherlands
- Members: Peter Stuyvesant
- Connected families: Bayard family Fish family Astor family
- Estates: Stuyvesant Square; Stuyvesant–Fish House; 2 East 79th Street

The Stuyvesant family is a family of American politicians and landowners in New York City. The family is of Dutch origin and is descended from Peter Stuyvesant (1610–1672), who was born in Peperga, Friesland, Netherlands, and served as the last Dutch Director-General of New Netherland.

== Members ==
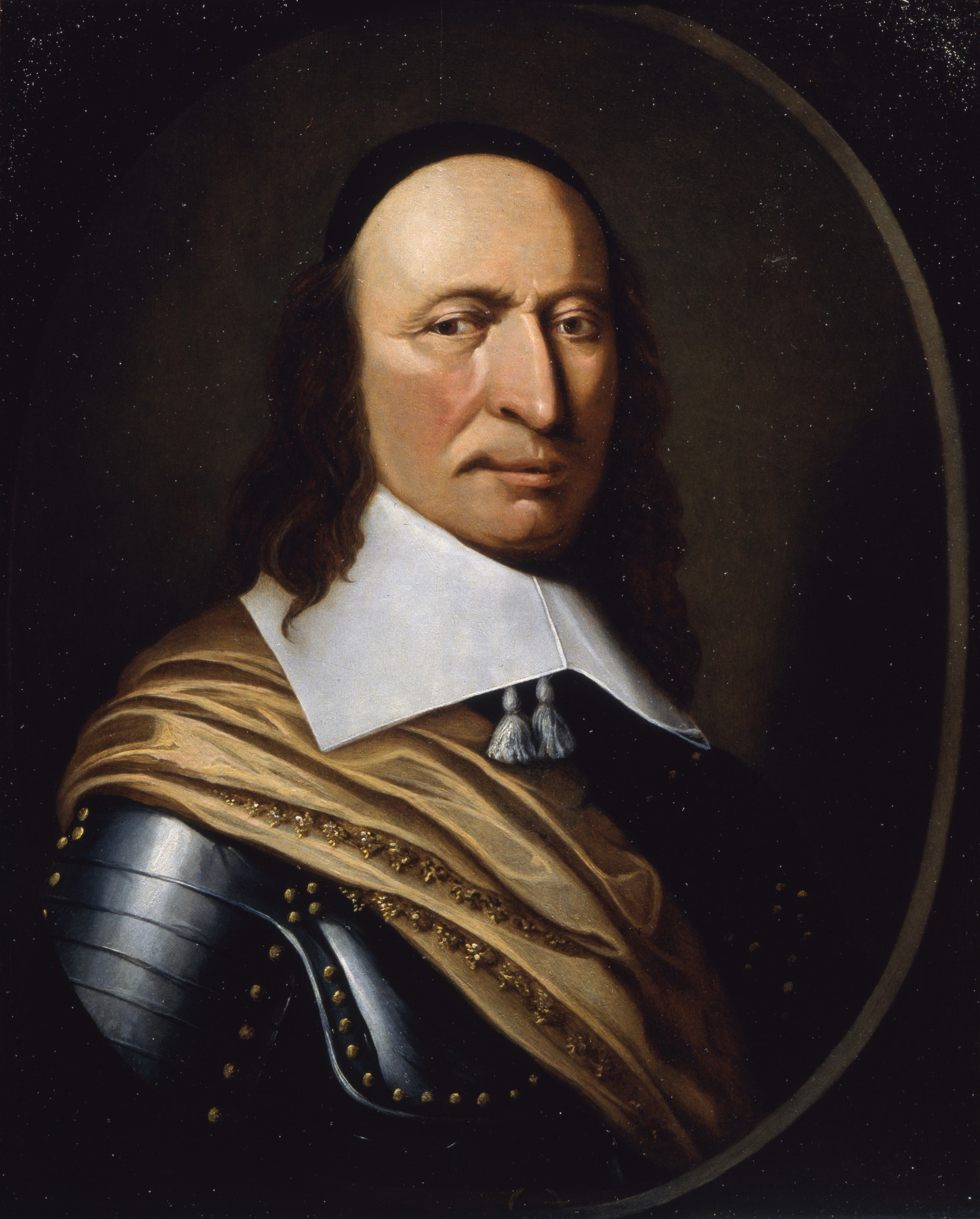
Portrait of Gov. Peter Stuyvesant, attributed to Hendrick Couturier, c. 1660

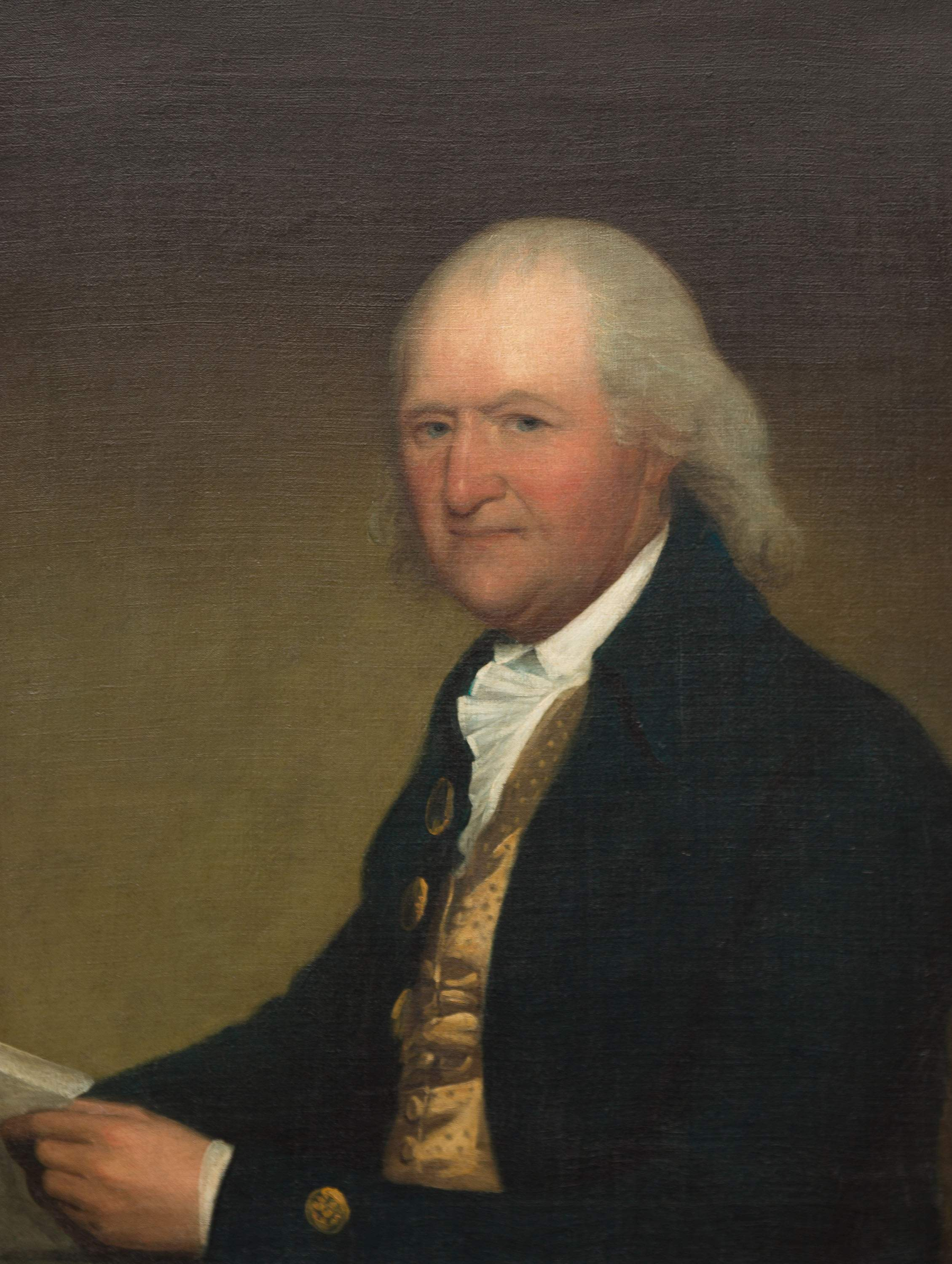
Portrait of Peter Stuyvesant (1727–1805) by Gilbert Stuart, c. 1793–1795.

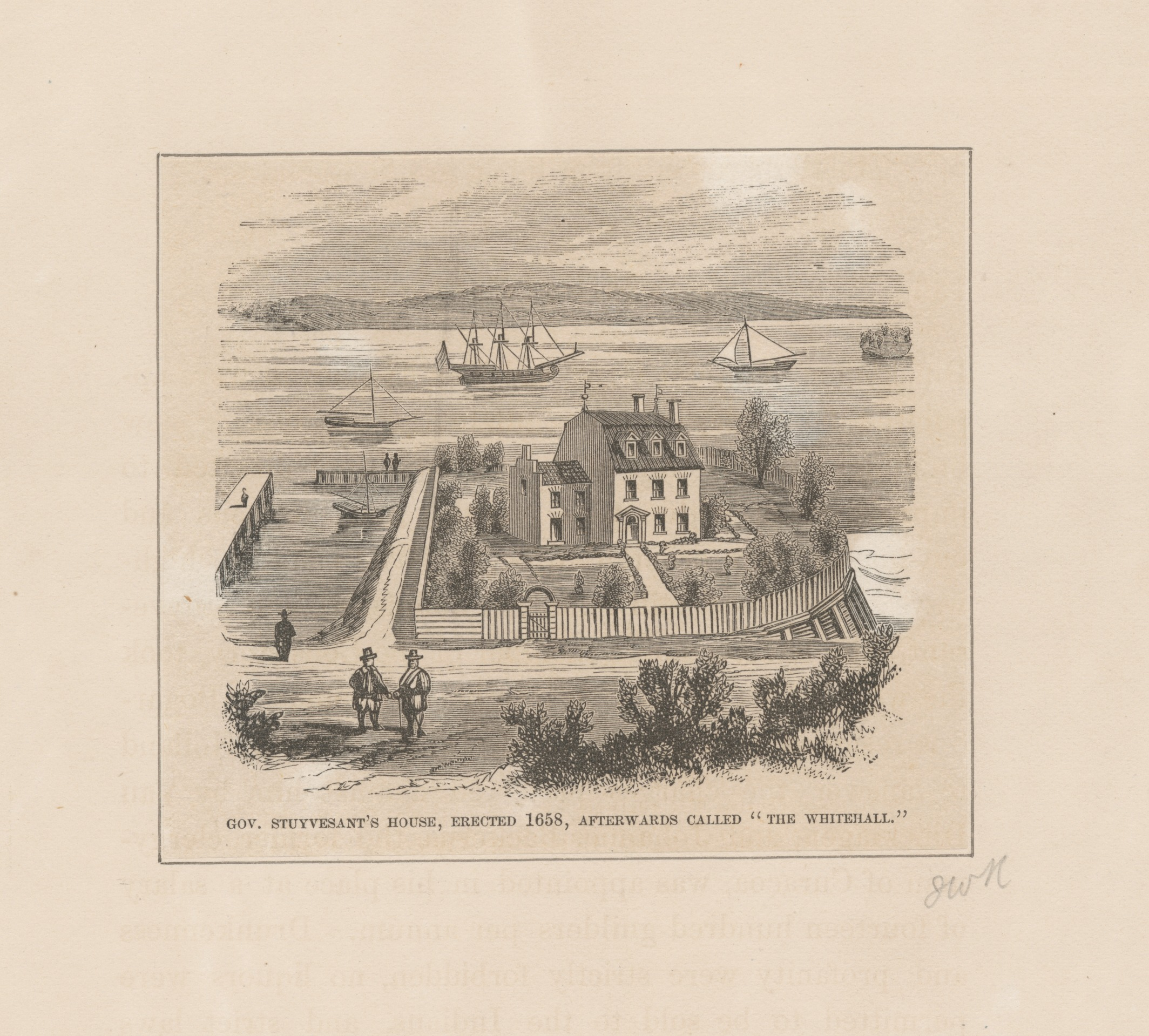
Gov. Stuyvesant's house, erected 1658, afterwards called The Whitehall

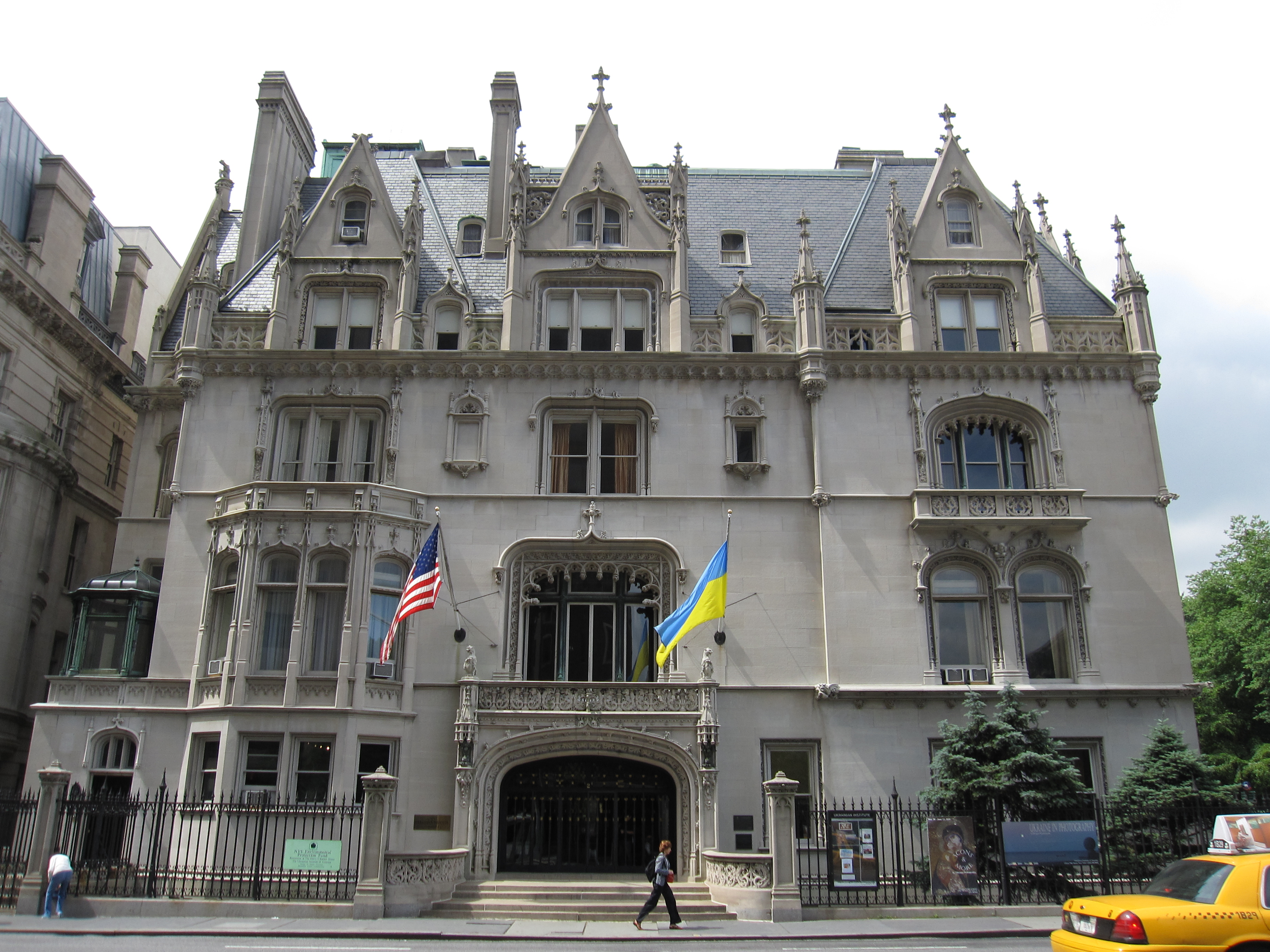
Augustus and Anne Van Horne Stuyvesant's home at 2 East 79th Street

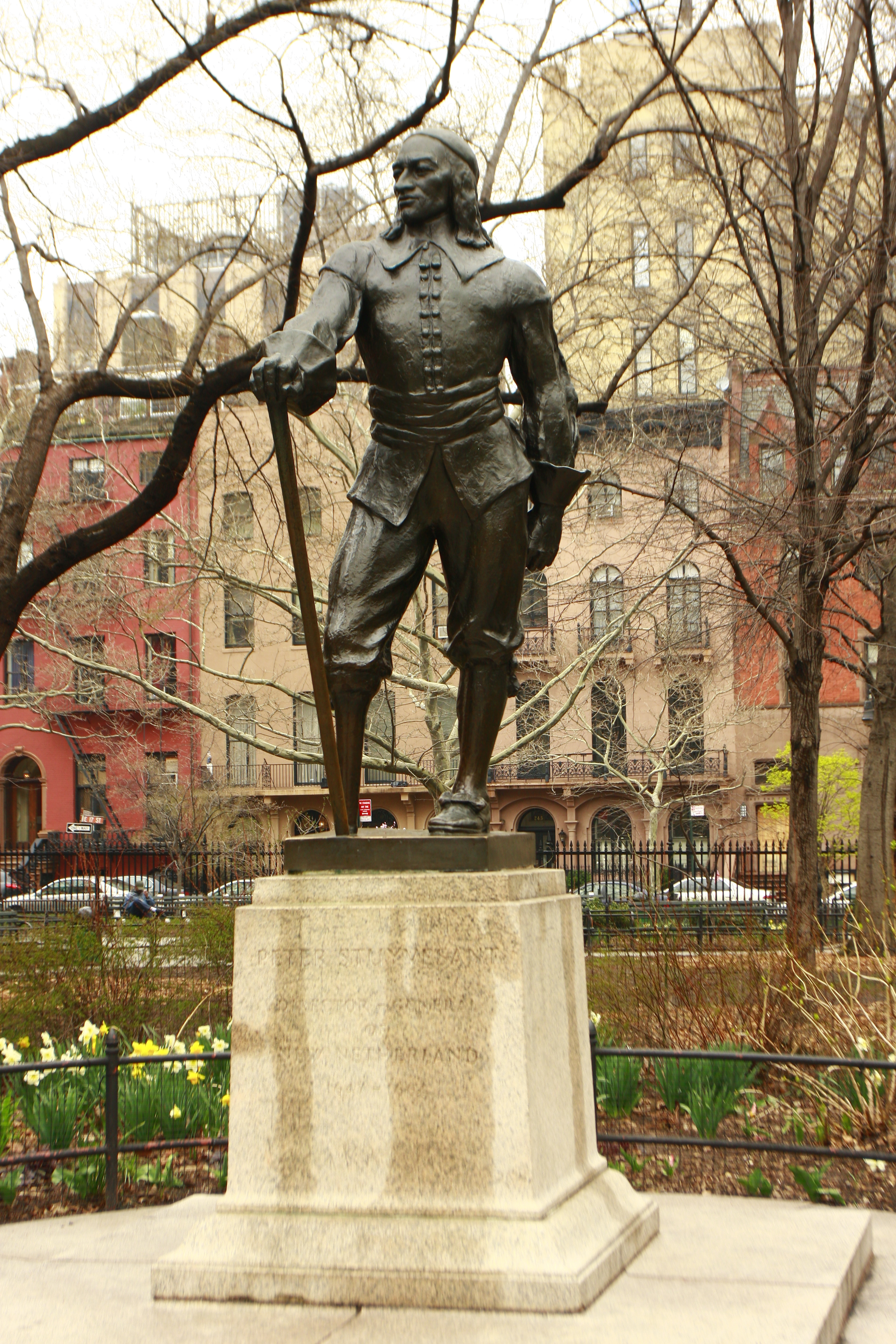
Gertrude Vanderbilt Whitney's statue of Peter Stuyvesant in the western half of Stuyvesant Square

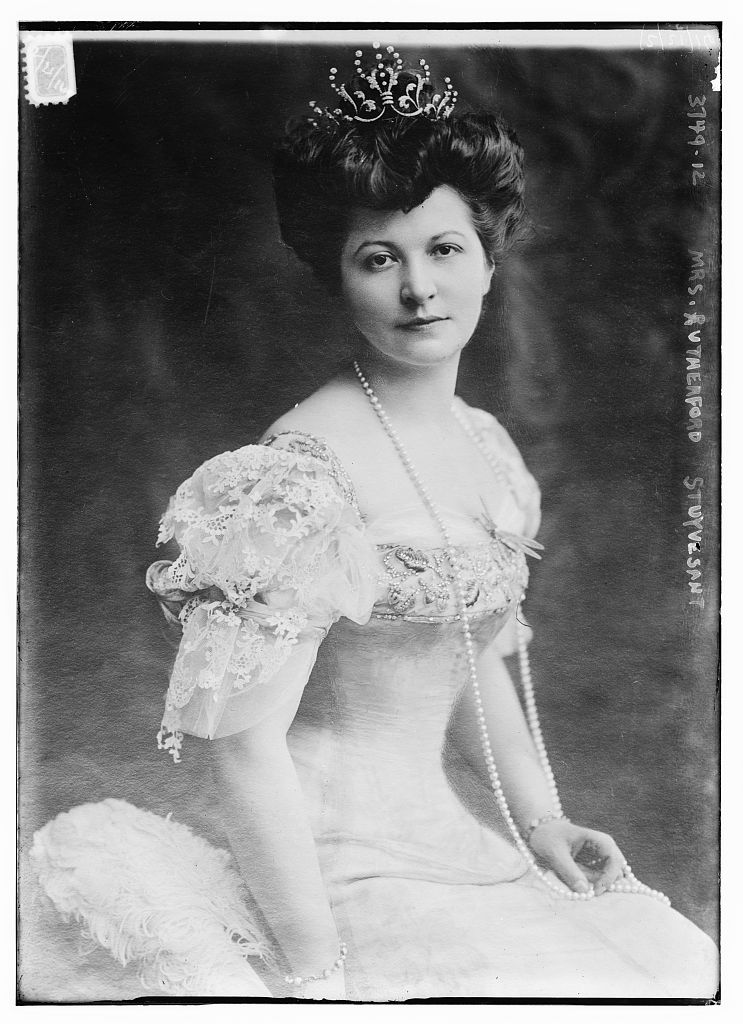
Mathilde, Countess de Wassenaer wife of Rutherfurd Stuyvesant

- Peter Stuyvesant (1610–1672), the Director-General of New Netherland who was involved with the Dutch West India Company.
- Peter Stuyvesant (1727–1805), a landowner and philanthropist in New York.
- Nicholas William Stuyvesant (1769–1833), a New York landowner and merchant
- Peter Gerard Stuyvesant (1778–1847), a New York landowner and philanthropist
- Hamilton Fish (1808–1893), a U.S. Representative, Lieutenant Governor of New York, Governor of New York, U.S. Senator from New York, and U.S. Secretary of State.
- John Winthrop Chanler (1826–1877), a lawyer and a U.S. Representative from New York.
- Rutherfurd Stuyvesant (1843–1909), a socialite and land developer.
- Stuyvesant Fish (1851–1923), president of the Illinois Central Railroad.
- Jonathan Mayhew Wainwright (1864–1945), an Assistant Secretary of War.
- Edith Stuyvesant Gerry (1873–1958), a philanthropist who was married to George Washington Vanderbilt II and U.S. Senator Peter Goelet Gerry.

== Legacy ==
Peter Stuyvesant, the son of a Calvinist minister, and his family were large landowners in the northeastern portion of New Amsterdam arising from his period as the last Dutch Director-General of New Netherland. Stuyvesant was known as:

"a man of strong individuality, great firmness and remarkable foresight, he so impressed himself upon the affairs that the story of his life from 1647 to 1664 is practically a history of the colony during that period."

Currently, the Stuyvesant name is associated with several places in Manhattan's East Side, near present-day Gramercy Park: the Stuyvesant Town housing complex; Stuyvesant Square, a park in the area; and the Stuyvesant Apartments on East 18th Street, and Stuyvesant Street. (Note: Stuyvesant Street is one of the oldest streets in the New York City borough of Manhattan. It runs diagonally from 9th Street at Third Avenue to 10th Street near Second Avenue.) Stuyvesant High School is located on Manhattan's West Side on Chamber's Street.

His farm, called the "Bouwerij" – the seventeenth-century Dutch word for "farm" – was the source for the name of the Manhattan street and surrounding neighborhood named "The Bowery". The contemporary neighborhood of Bedford–Stuyvesant, Brooklyn includes Stuyvesant Heights and retains its name.

== Family tree ==
- Balthazar Johannes Stuyvesant ∞ 1st marriage 1601 Margaretta Hardenstein 1575–1625 (see below 2nd marriage 1627 ∞ Christina Styntje Pieters 1606–1694)
  - Peter Stuyvesant (1610–1672) ∞ Judith Bayard (c. 1610–1687)
    - Balthazar Lazarus Stuyvesant (1647–1678) ∞ Maria Lucas Raapzaat
    - Nicholas Willem Stuyvesant (1648–1698) ∞ (1): Maria Beekman (1650–1679) (daughter of Wilhelmus Beekman); ∞ (2) Elizabeth Van Slichtenhorst
      - Peter Gerard Stuyvesant (1691–1777) ∞ Judith Bayard (b. 1685)
        - Nicholas William Stuyvesant (1722–1780)
        - Peter Stuyvesant (1727–1805) ∞ Margaret Livingston (1738–1818) (granddaughter of Robert Livingston the Elder)
          - Judith Stuyvesant (1765–1844) ∞ Benjamin Winthrop (1762–1844) (descendant of Wait Winthrop and Joseph Dudley)
            - Elizabeth Sheriffe Winthrop (1789–1866) ∞ Rev. Dr. John White Chanler (1789–1853).
              - John Winthrop Chanler (1826–1877) ∞ Margaret Astor Ward (1838–1875) (daughter of Samuel Cutler Ward and granddaughter of William Backhouse Astor Sr.)
                - John Armstrong Chanler (1862–1935) ∞ Amélie Rives Troubetzkoy (1863–1945).
                - Winthrop Astor Chanler (1863–1926) ∞ 1886: Margaret Louisa Terry (1862–1952).
                - Elizabeth Astor Winthrop Chanler (1866–1937), ∞ 1899: John Jay Chapman (1862–1933).
                - William Astor Chanler (1867–1934) ∞ Beatrice Ashley (1878–1946).
                - Lewis Stuyvesant Chanler (1869–1942) ∞ (1) 1890: Alice Chamberlain (1868–1955); ∞ (2) 1921: Julia Lynch Olin (1882–1961).
                - Margaret Livingston Chanler (1870–1963), ∞ 1906: Richard Aldrich (1863–1937).
                - Robert Winthrop Chanler (1872–1930), ∞ (1): Julia Remington (1872–1936); ∞ (2): Natalina Cavalieri (1874–1944).
                - Alida Beekman Chanler (1873–1969), ∞ Christopher Temple Emmet (1868–1957).
          - Cornelia Stuyvesant (1768–1825) ∞ Dirck Ten Broeck (1765–1833) (son of Abraham Ten Broeck)
          - Nicholas William Stuyvesant (1769/70–1833) ∞ Catharine Livingston Reade (1777–1863) (descendant of Robert Livingston)
            - Peter Stuyvesant (1796–1860) ∞ Julia Rebecca Martin (1805–1883)
              - Robert Van Rensselaer Stuyvesant (1837/8–1918)
              - Rosalie Stuyvesant (1843–1891) ∞ 1869: Aristide Pierre Pillot (1835–1884)
                - Peter Stuyvesant Pillot (1870–1935) ∞ (1): Dorothy Steedman Prewitt (1874–1900) ∞ (2): Gertrude Hubbard Grossman (1882–1919) (granddaughter of Gardiner Greene Hubbard)
            - Gerard Stuyvesant (1805–1859) ∞ Susan Rivington Van Horne (1812–1889)
              - Augustus Van Horne Stuyvesant (1838–1918) ∞ 1864: Harriet LeRoy Steward (1838–1918)
                - Anne Van Horne Stuyvesant (1870–1938)
                - Augustus Van Horne Stuyvesant Jr. (1870–1953) (Note: Augustus and his sister Anne, lived at a mansion at 2 East 79th Street at Fifth Avenue designed by Charles Pierrepont Henry Gilbert.)
            - Nicholas Stuyvesant (1805–1871) ∞ Augusta Chesebrough (1807–1876) (aunt of Robert Chesebrough)
              - Robert Stuyvesant (1835–1907) ∞ 1857: Frances J. Gibson.
              - Margaret Livingston Stuyvesant (1839–1928) ∞ John Howard Wainwright (1829–1871) (son of Bishop Jonathan Mayhew Wainwright)
                - John Howard Wainwright (1862–1911) ∞ Katherine Esther Walker (1861–1926)
                - Stuyvesant Wainwright (1863–1930) ∞ Caroline Smith Snowden (1865–1960) (daughter of A. Loudon Snowden)
                  - Stuyvesant Wainwright Jr. (1891–1975) ∞ Louise Flinn (1901–1986)
                  - Loudon Snowden Wainwright (1898–1942) ∞ Eleanor Painter Sloan (1903–1985)
                    - Loudon Snowden Wainwright Jr. (1924–1988) ∞ Martha Taylor
                      - Loudon Wainwright III (b. 1946) ∞ (1): Kate McGarrigle (1946–2010) ∞ (2): Suzzy Roche
                        - Rufus Wainwright (b. 1973)
                        - Martha Wainwright (b. 1976)
                        - Lucy Wainwright Roche (b. 1981)
                      - Sloan Wainwright (b. 1957)
                  - Carroll Livingston Wainwright I (1899–1967) ∞ Edith Catherine Gould (1900–1937) (daughter of George Jay Gould I)
                    - Stuyvesant Wainwright II (1921–2010) ∞ Janet Isabel Parsons (1920–2000)
                - Jonathan Mayhew Wainwright (1864–1945) ∞ Laura Wallace Buchanan (1865–1946)
            - Margaret Livingston Stuyvesant (1806–1845) ∞ Robert Van Rensselaer (1805–1840)
          - Elizabeth Stuyvesant (1775–1854) ∞ Nicholas Fish (1758–1833)
            - Fish family
          - Peter Gerard Stuyvesant (1778–1847) ∞ (1): Susannah Barclay (1785–1805) (daughter of Thomas Henry Barclay); ∞ (2): Helena Rutherfurd (1790–1873)
            - Margaret Chanler Stuyvesant (1820–1890) (Note: Margaret was the niece and adopted daughter of Peter Gerard Stuyvesant.) ∞ Lewis Morris Rutherfurd (1816–1892)
              - Rutherfurd Stuyvesant (1843–1909) (Note: In 1847, six year old Stuyvesant Rutherfurd changed his name to Rutherfurd Stuyvesant to conform with the will of his mother's great-uncle (and adopted father), Peter Gerard Stuyvesant, who died childless, in order to inherit the Stuyvesant fortune.) ∞ (1): Mary Pierrepont (1842–1879) (granddaughter of Peter Augustus Jay) ∞ (2): Mathilde Elizabeth Loewenguth (1877–1948), formerly Countess de Wassanaer
                - Lewis Rutherfurd Stuyvesant (1903–1944) ∞ Rosalie Stuyvesant Pillot (1907–1959)
                  - Peter Winthrop Rutherfurd Stuyvesant (1935–1970)
  - Anna Stuyvesant (1613–1683) ∞ Samuel Bayard (c. 1615–c. 1647)
    - Nicholas Bayard (c. 1644–1707) ∞ Judith Verlet
      - Bayard family
- ∞ Christina Styntje Pieters 1606–1694 (2nd marriage of Balthazar J. Stuyvesant 1627)
  - Margaret Grietie Margrietje Stuyvesant 1635–1682 (half-sister of Peter Stuyvesant)

== See also ==
- Fish, Livingston, Bayard, Astor families
