= Chanler =

Chanler is a surname. Notable people with the surname include:

- Robert Winthrop Chanler (1872–1930), American artist.
- Lewis Stuyvesant Chanler (1869–1942), New York lawyer
- John Winthrop Chanler (1826–1877), New York lawyer and a U.S. Representative from New York
- William A. Chanler (1867–1934), U.S. Representative from New York, son of John Winthrop Chanler
- Beatrice Chanler (1881–1946), American actress, sculptor and Cleopatra's Daughter biographer
- Theodore Ward Chanler (1902–1961), American composer
- Julia Lynch Olin, American author and Bahá'í
- Elizabeth Astor Winthrop Chanler, American heiress and socialite, daughter of John Winthrop Chanler. and wife of John Jay Chapman

== See also ==
- Chandler (surname)
