= Winthrop Astor Chanler =

American sportsman and soldier

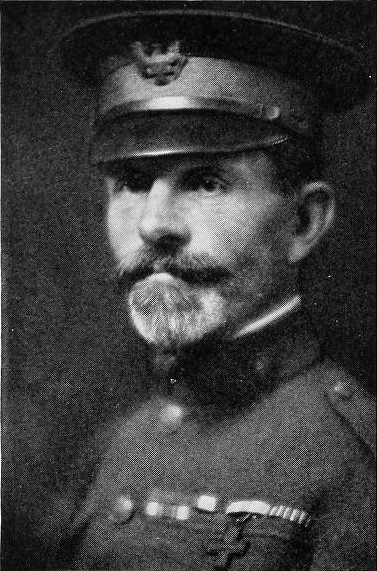
- Chanler during World War I
- Born: October 14, 1863; New York City, New York
- Died: August 24, 1926 (aged 62); Canandaigua, New York
- Education: Eton College; Harvard College
- Occupations: Soldier, sportsman
- Spouse: Margaret Louisa Terry (m. 1886–1926)
- Children: 8, including Theodore
- Parent(s): John Winthrop Chanler; Margaret Astor Ward
- Relatives: Astor family; Livingston family; Stuyvesant family

Winthrop Astor Chanler (October 14, 1863 – August 24, 1926) was an American sportsman and soldier. He was a member of the "Rough Riders" in the Spanish–American War. Chanler was a descendant of the Astor family, the Livingston family, and the Stuyvesant family. He and his wife were also prominent in New York society during the Gilded Age.

== Early life ==
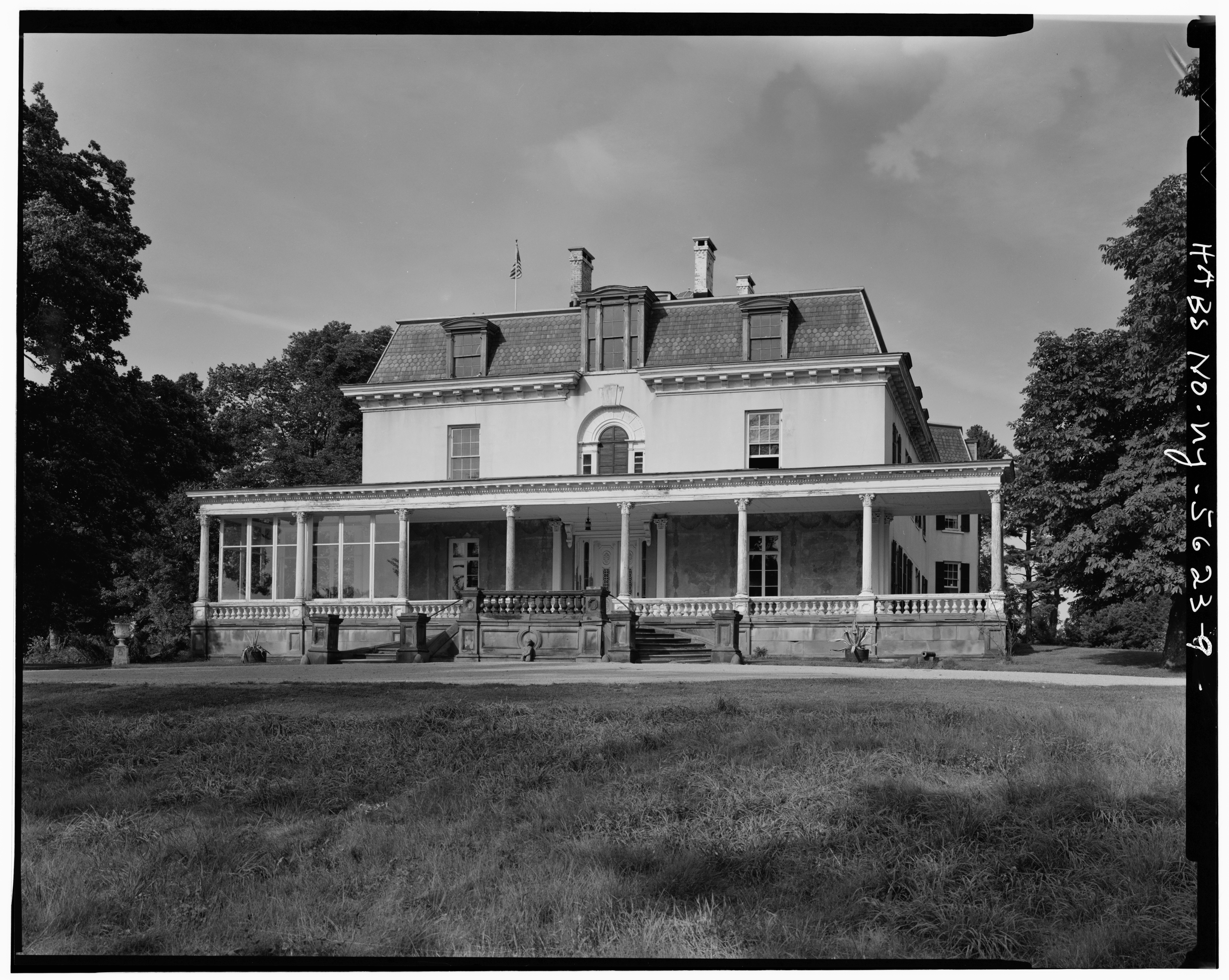
Rokeby, the Chanler family estate in Barrytown, built in 1811

Chanler, who was known as "Wintie" (Note: As a child he was nicknamed Wintie, but as an adult it was frequently written as Winty.) was born on October 14, 1863, in New York City. He was the second son of eleven children born to Margaret Astor (née Ward) (1838–1875) and John Winthrop Chanler (1826–1877), a U.S. Representative from New York. Through his mother, he was related to the Astor family, (Note: His maternal grandparents were Samuel Cutler Ward (a son of Samuel Ward III), and Emily Astor Ward (a daughter of William Backhouse Astor Sr. and granddaughter of John Jacob Astor). Emily Astor Ward was an older sister of William Backhouse Astor Jr. who was married to Caroline Schermerhorn Astor, also known as "The Mrs. Astor".) and through his father, he was related to the Livingston family and the Stuyvesant family. (Note: His paternal grandparents were Rev. Dr. John White Chanler, an Episcopalian clergyman, and Elizabeth Shirreff Winthrop. Elizabeth was a great-great-granddaughter of Wait Winthrop and Joseph Dudley and a three-times great-granddaughter of Peter Stuyvesant.) Of his ten brothers and sisters, many were prominent, including John Armstrong Chaloner, a writer; Robert Winthrop Chanler, an artist; and William Astor Chanler, a noted soldier and explorer who served in the U.S. House of Representatives like their father, Lewis Stuyvesant Chanler, the Lieutenant Governor of New York. His sister Margaret Livingston Chanler was married to critic Richard Aldrich and served as a nurse with the American Red Cross during the Spanish–American War, and sister Elizabeth Astor Winthrop Chanler was married to author John Jay Chapman.

He and his siblings became orphans after the death of their mother in December 1875 and their father in October 1877, both to pneumonia. The children, known as the "Astor Orphans", were raised at their parents' estate in Rokeby, New York, built by John Armstrong Jr., their matrilineal great-great-grandfather. His father's estate was valued between $1,500,000 (equivalent to $45,351,563) and $2,000,000 (equivalent to $60,468,750 in 2025 dollars). John Winthrop Chanler's will provided $20,000 a year for each child for life (equivalent to $470,563 in 2018 dollars), enough to live comfortably by the standards of the time. Winthrop himself inherited all of his father's personal property in his New York City home, located at 192 Madison Avenue, all of his real estate in Delaware County, and a house on Cliff Lawn in Newport.

Chanler prepared for university at Eton College and at St. John's Military Academy in Sing Sing, New York. In 1885, Winthrop graduated from Harvard College. While at Harvard, Winthrop was part of a prank played on Oscar Wilde when he appeared before the College to give a speech at the Boston Music Hall in 1882. Chanler, along with 60 other Harvard students, "marched down the center aisle in pairs, all carrying sunflowers and wearing Wildean costumes of knee breeches, black stockings, wide-spreading cravats, and shoulder length wigs." His grand-aunt Julia Ward Howe, who considered Winthrop her favorite, was in the audience and was apparently aghast at the prank.

== Career ==
During the Spanish–American War, Chanler did not enlist in the regular U.S. Army but instead joined the 1st United States Volunteer Cavalry, better known as the "Rough Riders", including his younger brother William, to join the Cuban volunteers under General Emilio Núñez. His brother received a Captain's commission from President William McKinley to serve under U.S. General Joseph Wheeler and Winthrop received a conditional commission as Lieutenant colonel under the Cuban government.

On June 30, 1898 in the Battle of Tayacoba, Chanler led twenty-five Rough Riders. Chanler, Captain Jose Manuel Núñez (brother of General Núñez), and William Louis Abbott and about thirty men went ashore near Trinidad, Cuba to ensure the safety of the landing site. They were discovered by Spanish scouts and came under heavy fire. During the battle, Captain Núñez was killed and Chanler was shot through the right elbow. They had to take cover in a mangrove swamp until they could be rescued by the American steamship Florida. Chanler returned to his home in Barrytown to recover from his injuries. By the time his arm healed, the war was over, so Chanler sailed to Europe where he stayed for several years in Sorrento, Italy taking a "life of hunting."

During World War I, Chanler served as an aide to General John J. Pershing, the commander of the American Expeditionary Force on the Western Front from 1917 to 1918.

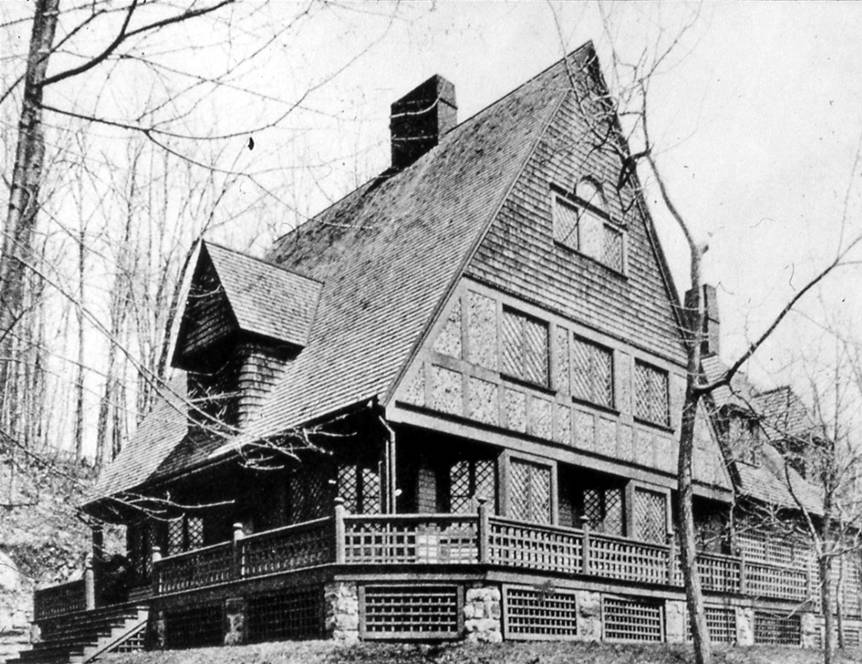
Chanler's cottage in Tuxedo Park, NY, c. 1886

== Personal life ==
On December 16, 1886, Chanler was married to Margaret Louisa Terry (1862–1952), a first cousin, once removed, in Rome, Italy. Her maternal grandparents Julia Rush Cutler Ward and Samuel Ward III were also the parents of Chanler's maternal grandfather Samuel Cutler Ward. Margaret, who grew up in the Palazzo Odescalchi in Rome, was the daughter of Louisa (née Ward) Crawford Terry and artist Luther Terry, and half-sister of F. Marion Crawford and Mary Crawford Fraser. She was also a niece of Julia Ward Howe, who was Chanler's grand-aunt.

After their marriage, the Chanlers moved to Washington, D.C., where they surrounded themselves with a group of friends, including Theodore Roosevelt, who was then the Civil Service Commissioner, and later President of the United States. Together, they were the parents of:

- Laura Astor Chanler (1887–1984), who married Lawrence Grant White (1887–1956), an architect with McKim, Mead & White and the son of Stanford White, in 1916.
- John Winthrop Chanler II (1889–1894), who died young.
- Beatrice Margaret Chanler (1891–1974), who married Pierre Francis Allegaert (1896–1961).
- Hester Marion Chanler (1893–1990), who married Edward Motley Pickman, a descendant of Dudley Leavitt Pickman, in 1915. Hester was a bridesmaid at the wedding of Ethel Roosevelt Derby in 1913.
- Marion Winthrop Chanler (1895–1931), who drowned.
- Margaret Gabrielle "May" Chanler (1897–1958), who married Porter Ralph Chandler (1899–1979).
- Hubert Winthrop Chanler (1900–1974), who married Gertrude Laughlin (1914–1999), daughter of Ambassador Irwin B. Laughlin.
- Theodore Ward Chanler (1902–1961), who married Maria De Acosta Sargent (1880–1970). Theodore's godfather was President Theodore Roosevelt, who attended his christening in Newport in 1902.

Due to his elder brother's mental issues, Winthrop became the de facto head of the Chanler family. The Chanler's spent the winter of 1891 to 1892 in New York where three of his sisters were introduced to society. Thereafter, they moved to Tuxedo Park, New York, which, according to his wife, "seemed dull in its exclusiveness; the tendency of Anglo-Saxons to separate into 'social sets and hierarchies' was in striking contrast to the hospitality and cosmopolitanism of Roman society" where she had grown up. In the late 1890s, they lived in Newport, Rhode Island where Chanler paid taxes on an estate valued at $96,300 in 1895.

In 1892, both Chanler and his wife Margaret were included in Ward McAllister's "Four Hundred", purported to be an index of New York's best families, published in The New York Times. Conveniently, 400 was the number of people that could fit into Mrs. Astor's ballroom. His wife described the list of New York's elite as "not unlike Dante's description of Paradise." Chanler, a member of the Society of Patriarchs, attended the Patriarch's Ball organized by McAllister for his fellow "American aristocrats" at Delmonico's in December 1892.

In 1903, Chanler moved from Newport to Geneseo, New York in Livingston County. While in Geneseo, he served as master of the hounds of the Genesee Valley Hunt Club. He reportedly spent most of his time fox hunting and horse breeding at his estate, Sweet Briar Farms, which was once owned by the Wadsworth family. In 1913, his wife, who was Catholic, built the Chapel of St. Felicity at the Farm.

On August 5, 1926, Chanler suffered a stroke following a fall from his horse. He died at Brigham Hall in Canandaigua, New York on August 24, 1926, and was buried at St. Mary's Catholic Cemetery in Geneseo, New York. After Chanler's death, his widow wrote several novels and a memoir entitled Roman Spring, published in 1934.
