= Teletape Studios =

Television studios in New York City

Reeves Teletape Studios were a group of television studios located in Manhattan in New York City. Owned by Reeves Communications Corporation, it was formed in 1974 by the merger of Reeves Sound Services (a sound and video post-production company and successor to the former Reeves Soundcraft - founded by Hazard E. Reeves), and Tele-tape Productions (a video remote truck and studio facility firm based in NY). Unitel Video bought the studio and its assets in late 1986, and operated them until at least 1993.

== Studios ==
- Ed Sullivan Theater (CBS Studio 50, 53rd Street and Broadway) A CBS soundstage that had been home to The Ed Sullivan Show, Teletape used the building during the 1980s for productions such as episodes of Kate & Allie. CBS regained control of the facility in 1993, and has since used it for The Late Show.
- Second Stage (CBS Studio 72, 81st Street and Broadway) This studio, built in 1916 as a vaudeville theater (part of the Keith-Orpheum (which became RKO) circuit), acquired by CBS in 1954 (for its first major New York color studio) and Teletape by 1969, was the first home to Sesame Street and later The Electric Company, 3-2-1 Contact, Search for Tomorrow, Love, Sidney and Kate & Allie. Demolished except for its facade in 1986.
- Third Stage (CBS Studio 58, Ninth Avenue and 55th Street) Built in 1923 as the Chaloner Theater, 841 Ninth Avenue (405 West 55th Street). In 1939, renamed and reduced in size as the Town Theatre, 851 Ninth Avenue and 55th Street, New York City. Became WNET Channel 13's Studio 55. later, Unitel Video Studio 55, Second home of Sesame Street and The Dick Cavett Show. Razed and replaced by the Alvin Ailey American Dance Theater's Joan Weill Center for Dance.
