= John Armstrong Chaloner =

American writer (1862–1935)

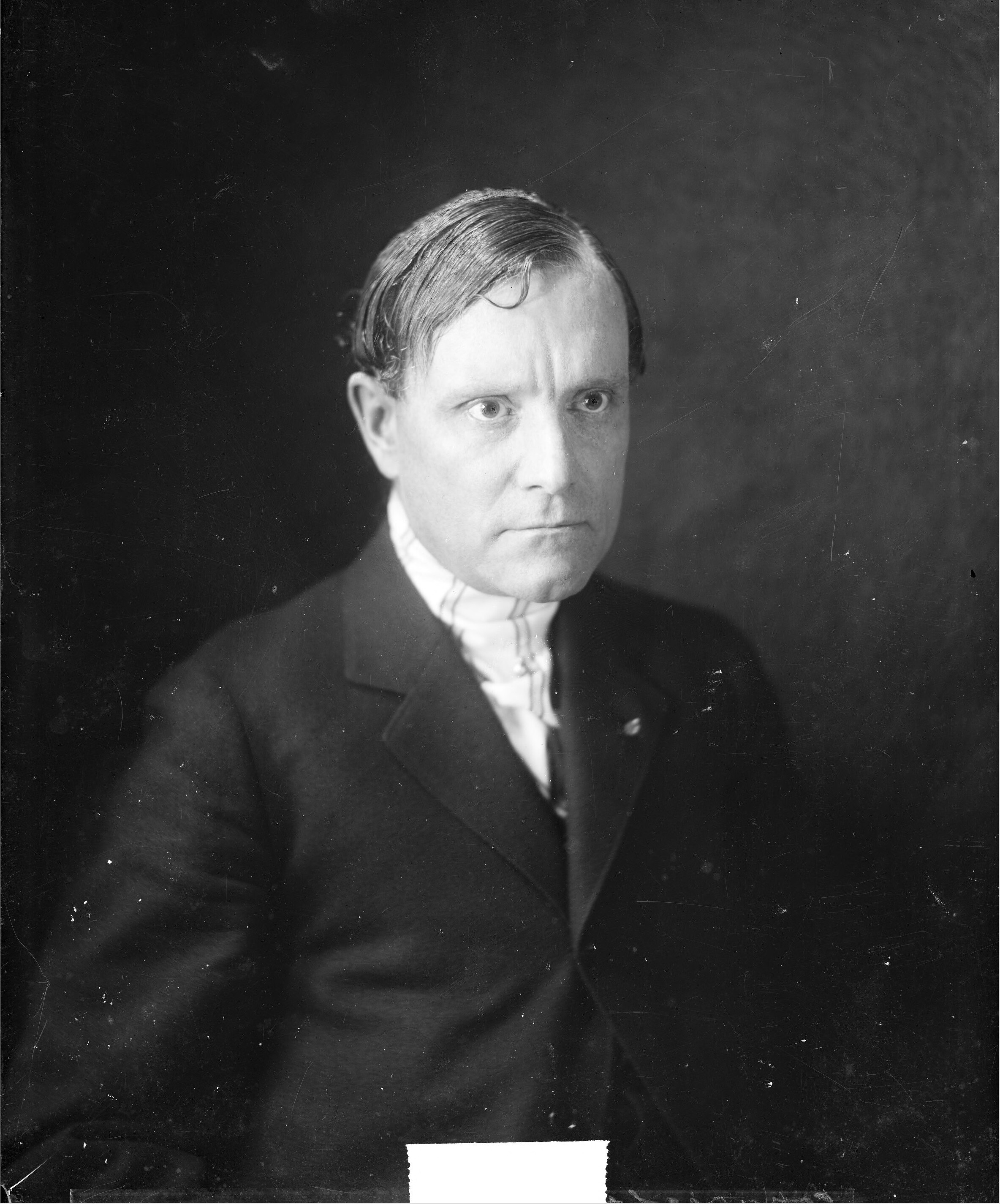
- Portrait of J. A. Chaloner by Rufus W. Holsinger, 1918.
- Born: John Armstrong Chanler; October 10, 1862; Manhattan, New York City
- Died: June 1, 1935 (aged 72); Charlottesville, Virginia
- Other name: Archie
- Occupations: Author, industrialist, philanthropist
- Spouse: Amélie Louise Rives (m. 1888; div. 1895)
- Parent(s): John Winthrop Chanler; Margaret Astor Ward
- Relatives: See Astor family and Livingston family

John "Archie" Armstrong Chaloner (né Chanler; October 10, 1862 – June 1, 1935) was an American writer and activist, known for his catch phrase "Who's looney now?".

== Early life ==
Chaloner was born John Armstrong Chanler on October 10, 1862, to Margaret Astor Ward Chanler and John Winthrop Chanler. Chaloner was related to the elite Astor, Livingston, and Stuyvesant families. He and his siblings became orphans after the death of their mother in December 1875 and their father in October 1877, both to pneumonia. The children were raised at their parents' estate in Rokeby, New York. John Winthrop Chanler's will provided $20,000 a year for each child for life (equivalent to $470,563 in 2018 dollars), enough to live comfortably by the standards of the time.

Chaloner had ten brothers and sisters, of whom he was the oldest, including the politician Lewis Stuyvesant Chanler and the artist Robert Winthrop Chanler. His sister Margaret Livingston Chanler served as a nurse with the American Red Cross during the Spanish–American War. Chaloner's brother Winthrop Astor Chanler served in the Rough Riders in Cuba and was wounded at the Battle of Tayacoba. His brother William Astor Chanler was a noted soldier and explorer and was elected to the US Congress in 1898. His sister Elizabeth Astor Winthrop Chanler married author John Jay Chapman.

Chaloner received some schooling in England and later returned to the United States, where he received his bachelor's and master's degrees at Columbia University. Chaloner went on to study at the Collège de France and the Ecole des Sciences Politiques.

== Career ==
On his twenty-first birthday in 1883, Chaloner inherited the estate at Rokeby along with $100,000 for its maintenance, however after his marriage began to disintegrate, he sold the title to his sister Margaret for a nominal fee and moved to North Carolina.

In 1892 he was accepted as a compatriot of the New York Society of the Sons of the American Revolution.

On June 1, 1908, he registered to have his last name legally changed from "Chanler" to Chaloner, which he believed to have been the surname's original spelling.

Chaloner helped found Roanoke Rapids, North Carolina, where he successfully built an electric power-generating station and a cotton mill. Later in his life his erratic behavior caused his family to have him declared legally insane, a measure that estranged him from his family until 1919, when the family reconciled. Chaloner was highly philanthropic where education was concerned and around 1890 established the Paris Prize Fund, later renamed the John Armstrong Chaloner Paris Prize Foundation in 1917.

== Insanity allegations ==
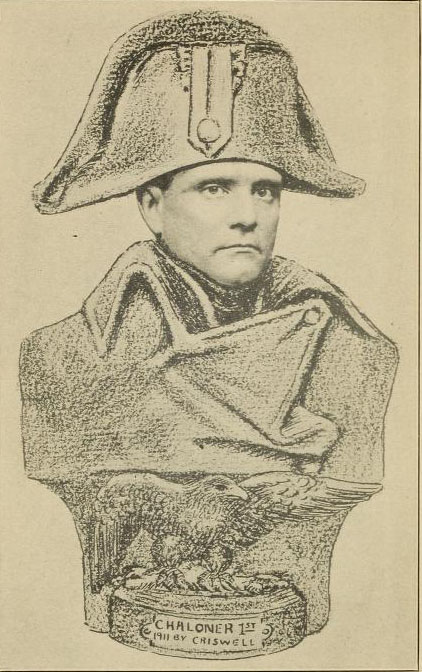
Image from Robbery Under Law. Chaloner believed it proved his resemblance to Napoleon.

By 1896 Chaloner began to claim that he was an "experimental psychologist of great insight" and through his work with the "X-Faculty" he began to exhibit increasingly erratic behavior. This provoked concern with his family and on March 13, 1897, they had him involuntarily committed to the Bloomingdale Insane Asylum in White Plains, New York. For his part, Chaloner believed that he was being committed so his family could take charge of his estate and experiments and wrote several sonnets to illustrate this belief. He was declared insane on March 13, 1897, and a New York court recommended that he be permanently institutionalized, however Chaloner escaped the following year and went to a private clinic, where he was deemed able to function in regular society. Soon after, Chaloner began challenging the court's decision and laws on mental illness, which brought him into the national spotlight. He was later declared sane in both Virginia and North Carolina and some of his proponents compared his experiments to research on parapsychology. During this time Chaloner publicly lectured on his X-Faculty experiments, but his lectures frequently featured diatribes against his family and psychiatry in general. He also published several books including Four Years Behind the Bars of "Bloomingdale," or, The Bankruptcy of Law in New York, (1906) and Hell: Per a Spirit-Message Therefrom (Alleged): a Study in Graphic-Automatism (1912).

In 1909 Chaloner received additional attention when he accidentally shot and killed his neighbor John Gillard at Merry Mills. Gillard's wife had fled to Chaloner's home due to domestic abuse. While he was acquitted of responsibility, Chaloner paid for Gillard's funeral and gravestone, and also suffered a nervous breakdown that caused him to leave Merry Mills for several months. Chaloner would later write about Gillard's death in Robbery Under Law; Or, The Battle of the Millionaires: A Play in Three Acts.

== Personal life ==
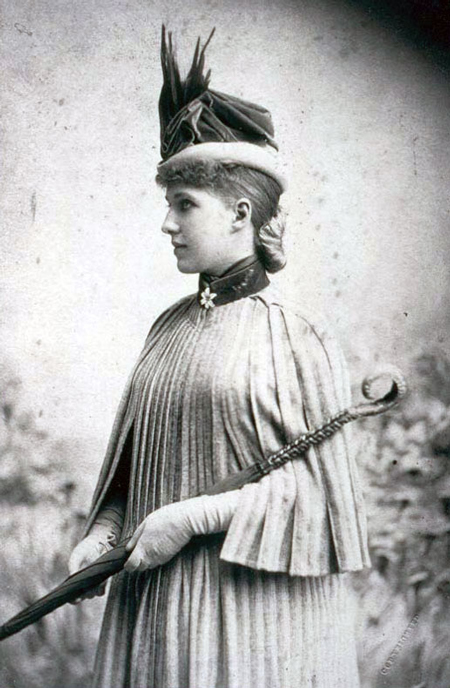
Amélie Louise Rives

On June 14, 1888, he married the author Amélie Louise Rives. The marriage was considered scandalous by Chaloner's family, who disapproved of her due to erotic passages in her book The Quick or the Dead? A Study—especially as one of the characters greatly resembled Chaloner. Chaloner's marriage to Rives was notoriously unhappy and in 1895 Rives sought and was successfully granted a divorce in South Dakota. Rives remarried only months later to Prince Pierre Troubetzkoy and Chaloner further scandalized his family by purchasing Merry Mills, the estate near the Troubetzkoys' home in Albemarle County, Virginia. Chaloner became close friends with the Troubetzkoys and also continued to pay Rives a yearly sum of money—events that caused his brother Robert Winthrop Chanler to call him a "looney". This statement prompted Chaloner to send a telegram to Robert and the press, after Robert signed a poorly thought-out prenup with Lina Cavalieri, titled "Who's Looney Now?".

Chaloner died on June 1, 1935, in Charlottesville, Virginia, of cancer.

== Chaloner Theater ==
In 1921, the Chaloner Theater, was designed by George Keister, built by Shroder & Koppel, decorated by 'Winter & Raub', for John Armstrong Chaloner, and opened in 1923, with 1568 seats, for silent movies, at 841 Ninth Avenue, New York, NY at the northwest corner of West 55th Street.

In 1939, it was sold, reduced in size to 1000 seats and renamed The Town Theatre, 851 Ninth Avenue and 55th Street, New York City. It closed July 17, 1950.

In 1950, CBS leased it, took out all the seating and it became CBS Studio 58.

In 1961, CBS donated the building to Educational Television for the Metropolitan Area, becoming WNET Channel 13's Studio 55. home to the show Critique. Later, it became Unitel Video Studio 55,

It was the second home to Sesame Street and hosted The Dick Cavett Show. Lastly, it was home to the cooking show, Emeril Live.

It was razed in November 2002, and replaced by the Alvin Ailey American Dance Theater's Joan Weill Center for Dance.

== Works ==
- Four Years Behind the Bars of "Bloomingdale," or, The Bankruptcy of Law in New York (1906)
- The Lunacy Law of the World: Being That of Each of the Forty-Eight States and Territories of the United States, with an Examination Thereof and Leading Cases Thereon; Together with That of the Six Great Powers of Europe—Great Britain, France, Italy, Germany, Austria-Hungary, and Russia (1906)
- Scorpio: (Sonnets) (1907)
- The X-Faculty, or, the Pythagorean Triangle of Psychology (1911)
- Hell: Per a Spirit-Message Therefrom (Alleged): a Study in Graphic-Automatism (1912)
- Petition for the Impeachment for Malfeasance in Office of George C. Holt, Judge of the Federal District Court for the Southern District of New York (New York City) (1912)
- The Swan-Song of "Who's Looney Now?" (1914)
- "Saul"; A Tragedy in Three Acts (1915)
- A Brief for the Defence of the Unequivocal Divinity of the Founder of Christianity as the Son of Jehovah ... Palmetto Press. 1924 – via google books.
- Robbery Under Law; Or, The Battle of the Millionaires: A Play in Three Acts and Three Scenes, Time, 1887; Treating of the Adventures of the Author of "Who's Looney Now?". Palmetto Press. 1915 – via google books.
