= Lewis Stuyvesant Chanler =

American lawyer and politician

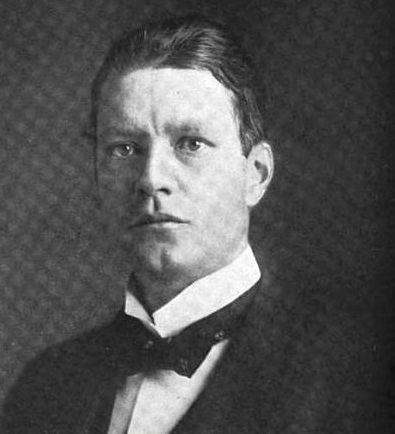

Lieutenant Governor of New York
- In office 1 January 1907 – 31 December 1908
- Governor: Charles Evans Hughes
- Preceded by: John Raines (acting)
- Succeeded by: Horace White

Member of the New York State Assembly from the 2nd Dutchess County district
- In office January 1, 1910 – December 31, 1912
- Preceded by: Everett H. Travis
- Succeeded by: John Augustus Kelly

Personal details
- Born: September 24, 1869 Newport, Rhode Island, U.S.
- Died: February 28, 1942 (aged 72) New York City, U.S.
- Party: Democratic
- Spouses: Alice Chamberlain (m. 1890; div. 1920) Julia Lynch Olin (m. 1921)
- Children: 3
- Parent(s): John Winthrop Chanler; Margaret Astor Ward
- Relatives: Astor family; Stuyvesant family
- Education: Columbia University; Cambridge University
- Occupation: Lawyer

Lewis Stuyvesant Chanler (September 24, 1869, in Newport, Rhode Island – February 28, 1942, in New York City) was an American lawyer and politician who served as the lieutenant governor of New York from 1907 to 1908.

== Early life ==
He was the fifth son of John Winthrop Chanler of the Stuyvesant family and Margaret Astor Ward of the Astor family. Through his father, who served as a U.S. Representative from New York, he was a great-great-grandson of Peter Stuyvesant and a great-great-great-great-grandson of Wait Winthrop and Joseph Dudley. Through his mother, he was a grandnephew of Julia Ward, John Jacob Astor III, and William Backhouse Astor Jr., and a great-great-grandson of John Jacob Astor.

Lewis had ten brothers and sisters, including the artist Robert Winthrop Chanler and the soldier and explorer William Astor Chanler. His sister Margaret Livingston Chanler served as a nurse with the American Red Cross during the Spanish–American War. His older brother Winthrop Astor Chanler served in the Rough Riders in Cuba and was wounded at the Battle of Tayacoba. Chanler's eldest brother, John Armstrong Chaloner, married novelist Amélie Rives Troubetzkoy. Chanler and his siblings became orphans after the death of their mother in 1875 and their father in 1877, both to pneumonia. John Winthrop Chanler's will provided $20,000 a year for each child for life (equivalent to $470,563 in 2018 dollars), enough to live comfortably by the standards of the time. The children were raised at their parents' estate, Rokeby, in Barrytown, New York.

He attended Columbia University Law School and graduated in 1891. Then he attended Cambridge University, matriculating at Trinity College in 1894.

== Career ==
After Cambridge, he began practicing law in New York, as a criminal defense lawyer. During the winter 1897, he visited Ireland and became interested in the Parnellite party which was seeking home rule for Ireland. He toured the country for several years, making speeches on behalf of home rule.

=== Political career ===
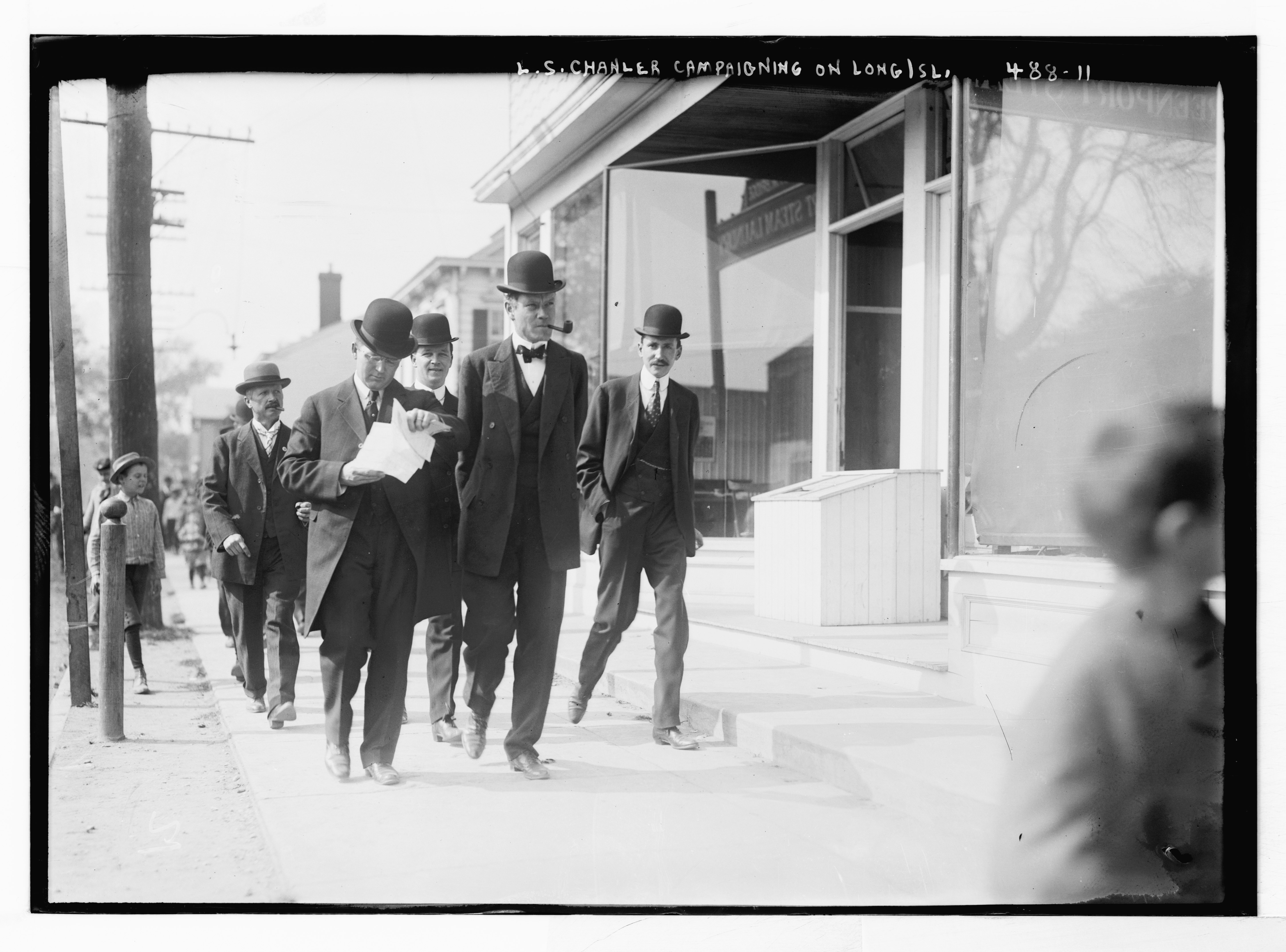
Chanler campaigning at Greenport, Long Island, 1908

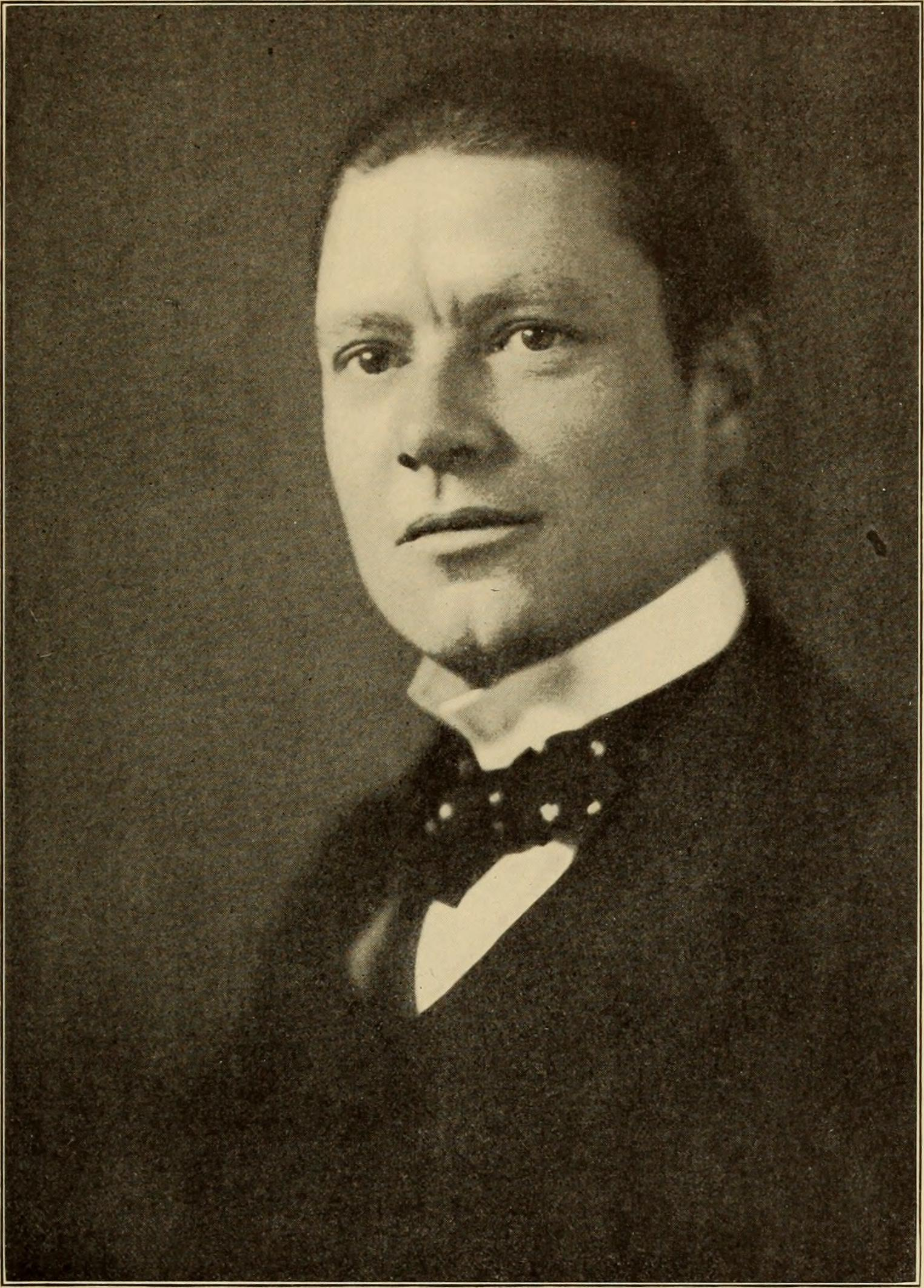
Chanler on his election as Lieutenant-Governor of New York State on January 1, 1907

Chanler was active in the Democratic Party in Dutchess County and was a Delegate to several state party conventions. In 1903, he was elected a member of the Dutchess County Board of Supervisors.

In 1906, he was elected the Lieutenant Governor of New York. He ran on the combined ticket of the Democratic Party and the Independence League, defeating the incumbent M. Linn Bruce, although his running mate William Randolph Hearst was defeated in his quest for the governorship by Republican Charles Evans Hughes, who later became Chief Justice of the United States.

As the sitting lieutenant governor, he ran as the Democratic candidate for Governor against the incumbent Hughes in 1908, with John Alden Dix as the candidate for Lt. Governor. Ultimately, he was defeated, and his candidacy was opposed by Hearst, who lampooned him in a series of cartoons.

While a resident of Barrytown, Dutchess County, New York, he was a member of the New York State Assembly (Dutchess Co., 2nd D.) in 1910, 1911 and 1912. Franklin D. Roosevelt had at first thought of running for this seat in the assembly, but Chanler refused to give it up. Thus, Roosevelt ran in November 1910 for the Senate instead.

== Personal life ==
On September 24, 1890, Chanler married Alice Chamberlain, at St George's, Hanover Square, in London. Alice was a daughter of the late W. L. Chamberlain. Before their divorce in 1920, they had three children together:

- Lewis Stuyvesant Chanler Jr. (1891–1963), who married Leslie Alice Murray (1898–1952) in 1920. She died in 1952 and he later married Mary Kroehle. Lewis and Leslie had four children: Susan Patricia Chanler Herrick (1921–1996); Bronson Winthrop Chanler (1922–2009); Clare Chanler Forster (1927–1992), who married Bayard Stuyvesant Forster (1924–2001), a distant relative; and Rosanna Chanler Harris (1930-).
- Alida Chanler (1894–1983), who married William Christian Bohn (1895–1977) in 1920.
- William Chamberlain Chanler (1895–1981), who married Frances Randall Williams

On May 23, 1921, the 52-year-old Chanler married Julia Lynch Olin, also a recent divorcee with two daughters of her own, in Paris. She was previously married to J. Philip Benkard and was the second daughter of Stephen H. Olin. Her mother died in 1882 and her father remarried Emmeline Harriman, the daughter of Oliver Harriman and the sister-in-law of William Kissam Vanderbilt. In 1922, the family bought a new home at 132 East 65th Street, in New York City. This house was later christened Caravan House.

Chanler died on February 28, 1942, at his home in New York City at age 72. His funeral was conducted at St. Mark's Church in-the-Bowery by Rev. C. A. W. Brocklebank. After the scriptural reading, Mirza Ahmad Sohrab read from "the service for the departed" of the Baháʼí Faith. Chanler was buried at St Paul's Churchyard in Glen Cove, Long Island.

Political offices
Preceded by John Raines; Acting	Lieutenant Governor of New York; 1907–1908	Succeeded by Horace White
Party political offices
Preceded by Francis Burton Harrison	Democratic nominee for Lieutenant Governor of New York; 1906	Succeeded by John Alden Dix
Preceded by William Randolph Hearst	Democratic Nominee for Governor of New York defeated 1908	Succeeded by John Alden Dix
New York State Assembly
Preceded by Frederick Northrup	New York State Assembly, Dutchess County 2nd District; 1910–1912	Succeeded by John Augustus Kelly
