= Robert Winthrop Chanler =

American artist (1872–1930)

- Born: February 22, 1872; New York City, U.S.
- Died: October 24, 1930 (aged 58); Woodstock, New York, U.S.
- Occupation: Artist
- Spouses: Julia Remington Chamberlain (m. 1893; div. 1907) Natalina Cavalieri (m. 1910; div. 1912)
- Children: 2
- Parents: John Winthrop Chanler (father); Margaret Astor Ward (mother)
- Relatives: Astor family; Stuyvesant family

Robert Winthrop Chanler (February 22, 1872 – October 24, 1930) was an American artist. He was member of the Astor family and Stuyvesant family. A designer and muralist, Chanler received much of his art training in France at the École des Beaux-Arts, and there his most famous work, titled Giraffes, was completed in 1905 and later purchased by the French government. Robert D. Coe, who studied with him, said he was "eccentric and almost bizarre." Chanler rose to prominence as an acclaimed American artist when his work was exhibited in the 1913 Armory Show in New York City.

== Family and early life ==
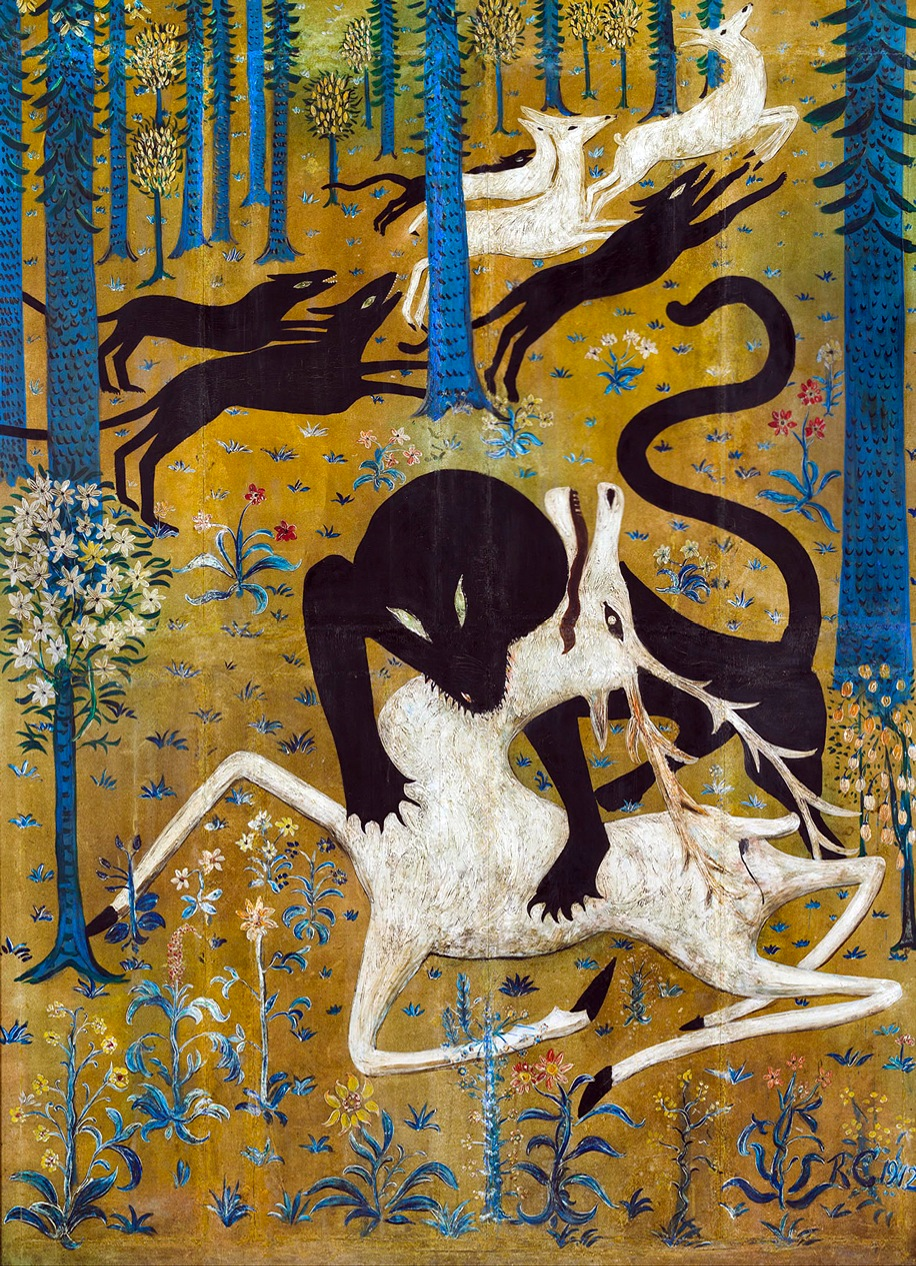
Robert Winthrop Chanler, 1912, Leopard and Deer, gouache or tempera on canvas, mounted on wood, 194.3 cm × 133.4 cm (76.5 in × 52.5 in), Rokeby Collection. Exhibited at the Armory Show, New York, 1913

Chanler was born on February 22, 1872, in New York City to John Winthrop Chanler of the Stuyvesant family and Margaret Astor Ward of the Astor family. Through his father, he was a great-great-grandson of Peter Stuyvesant and a great-great-great-great-grandson of Wait Winthrop and Joseph Dudley. Through his mother, he was a grandnephew of Julia Ward Howe, John Jacob Astor III, and William Backhouse Astor, Jr.

Robert had 10 brothers and sisters, including politicians Lewis Stuyvesant Chanler and William Astor Chanler. His sister Margaret Livingston Chanler served as a nurse with the American Red Cross during the Spanish–American War. Robert's eldest brother John Armstrong "Archie" Chanler married novelist Amélie Rives Troubetzkoy. His older brother Winthrop Astor Chanler served in the Rough Riders in Cuba and was wounded at the Battle of Tayacoba.

His siblings and he became orphans after the death of their mother in 1875 and their father in 1877, both to pneumonia. The children were raised at their parents' Rokeby Estate in Barrytown, New York. John Winthrop Chanler's will provided $20,000 a year for each child for life (equivalent to $470,563 in 2018), enough to live comfortably by the standards of the time. Several of Chanler's paintings still decorate the mansion at Rokeby.

== Career ==
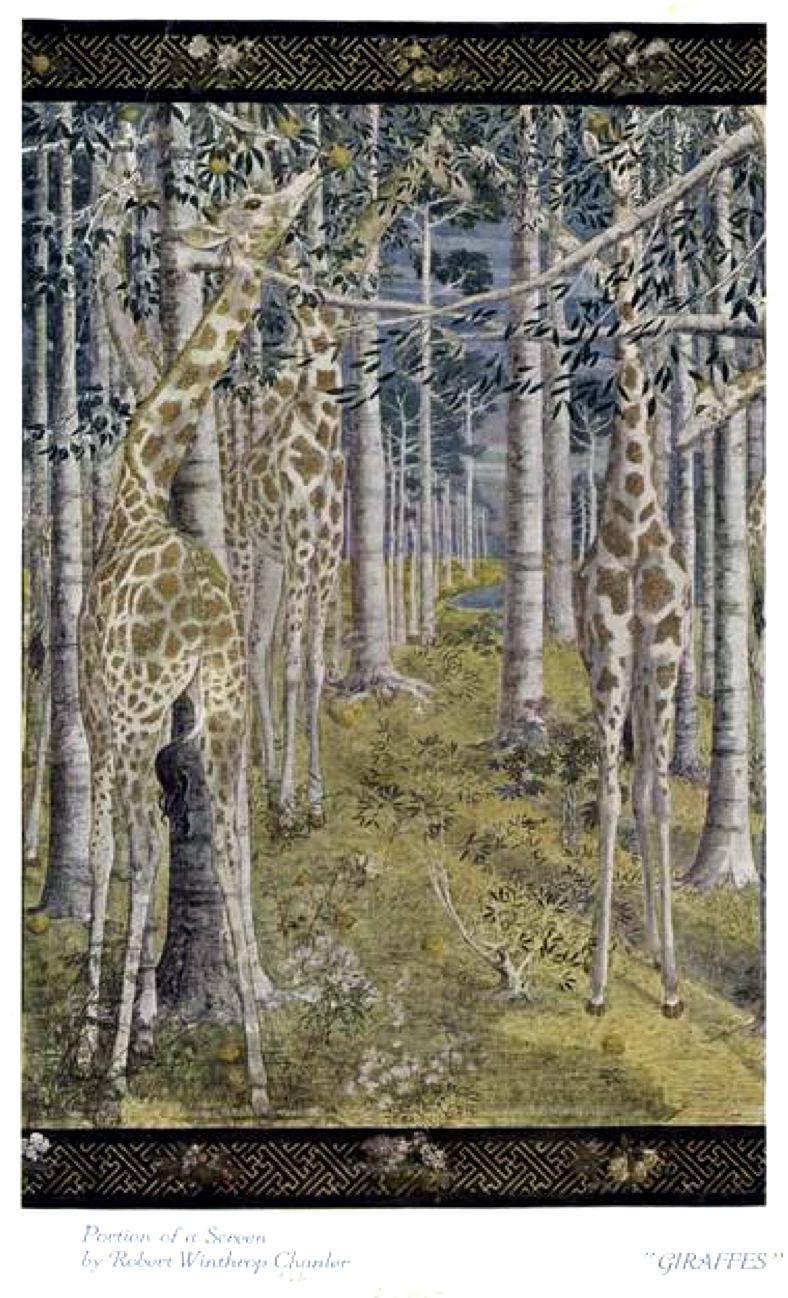
Robert Winthrop Chanler, 1905, Giraffes, portion of a screen, print, published 1922

Like Mai Rogers Coe and Everett Shinn, Chanler was staying in Paris in the 1890s and became involved with the art community. When he returned to the U.S. in the early 1900s, he purchased a townhouse on East 19th Street, decorated it with his own works, and called it his House of Fantasy. The townhouse became a social center for New York's art community. Like Shinn, Chanler was a personality and a figure in his time.

Chanler was a member of the New York State Assembly (Dutchess Co., 2nd D.) in 1904, but did not run for re-election. In 1907, he was elected sheriff of Dutchess County, New York, and remained in that office for three years.

Chanler specialized in painted screens and was a member of the National Society of Mural Painters. A ceiling mural of buffaloes painted by Chanler is in the Coe House in Brookville, New York. He was also a member of the Architectural League of New York. He painted a ceiling inside the Colony Club, a private member's club located at Park Avenue and 62nd Street in New York City.

In 1905, Chanler exhibited a work entitled Au Pays des Girafes (or et argent) at the Salon d'Automne in Paris (no. 328 of the catalogue). This was the exhibition that prompted critic Louis Vauxcelles to label a group of painters "fauves" (wild beasts), thus marking the birth of Fauvism.

=== The Armory Show ===
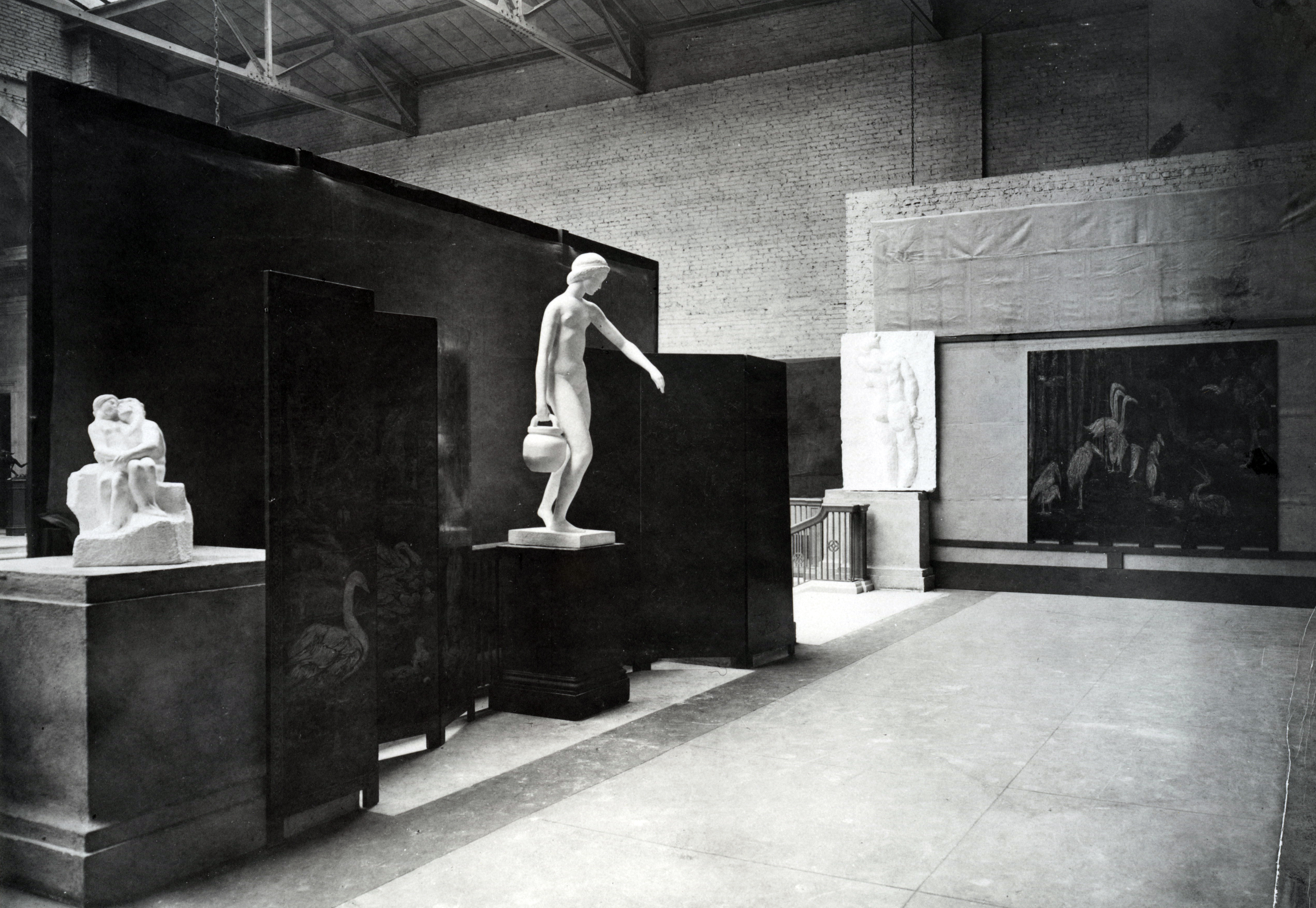
The 1913 Armory Show in Chicago featuring two of Chanler's screens

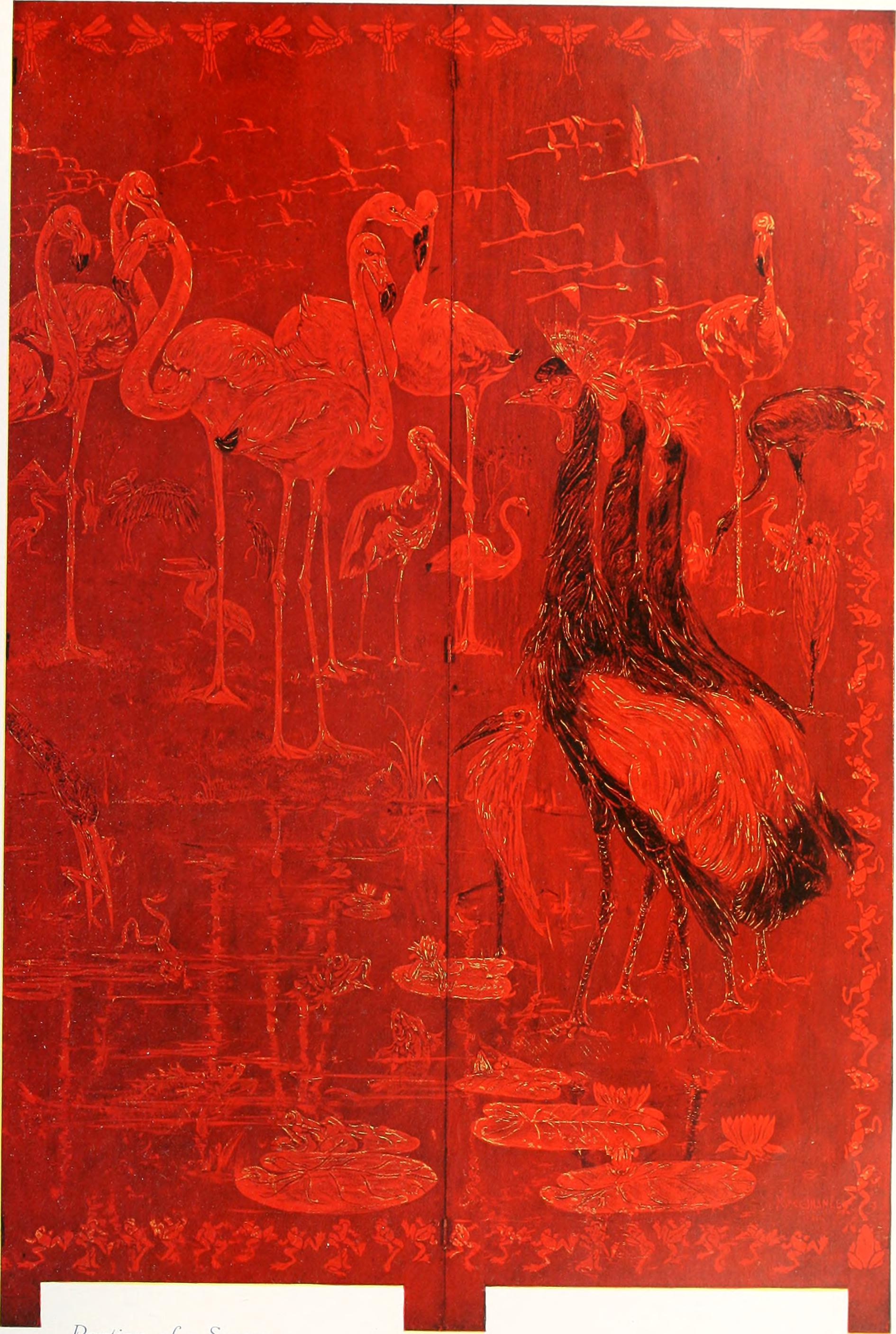
Flamingoes, 1897

Chanler's work was featured in the 1913 Armory Show in New York, and he was one of the most acclaimed American artists in the exhibition. The elaborately painted screens he submitted were placed near the entrance of the show (Gallery A), where they captured the attention of the public and critics. Chanler's screen titled Hopi Indian Snake Dance was reproduced in the New York Herald, 15 February 1913. A work titled Porcupines was reproduced on postcard made for the Armory Show. Another screen by Chanler depicting porcupines is currently in the collection of the Metropolitan Museum of Art, New York. According to the catalogues for the Armory Show, Chanler was represented by nine screens at the New York venue and eight screens at the Art Institute of Chicago, but photographs and written sources, including Walter Pach's annotated New York catalogue and the Supplement to the New York catalogue located in the Armory Show records and the Walter Pach papers, indicate that around 25 screens were displayed during the three weeks in Manhattan, and at least nine at the Chicago exhibition.

=== Patrons and friends ===
Chanler's portrait, painted by his friend Guy Pène du Bois in 1915, came to epitomize the world of money, fashion, and status with which he was well acquainted.

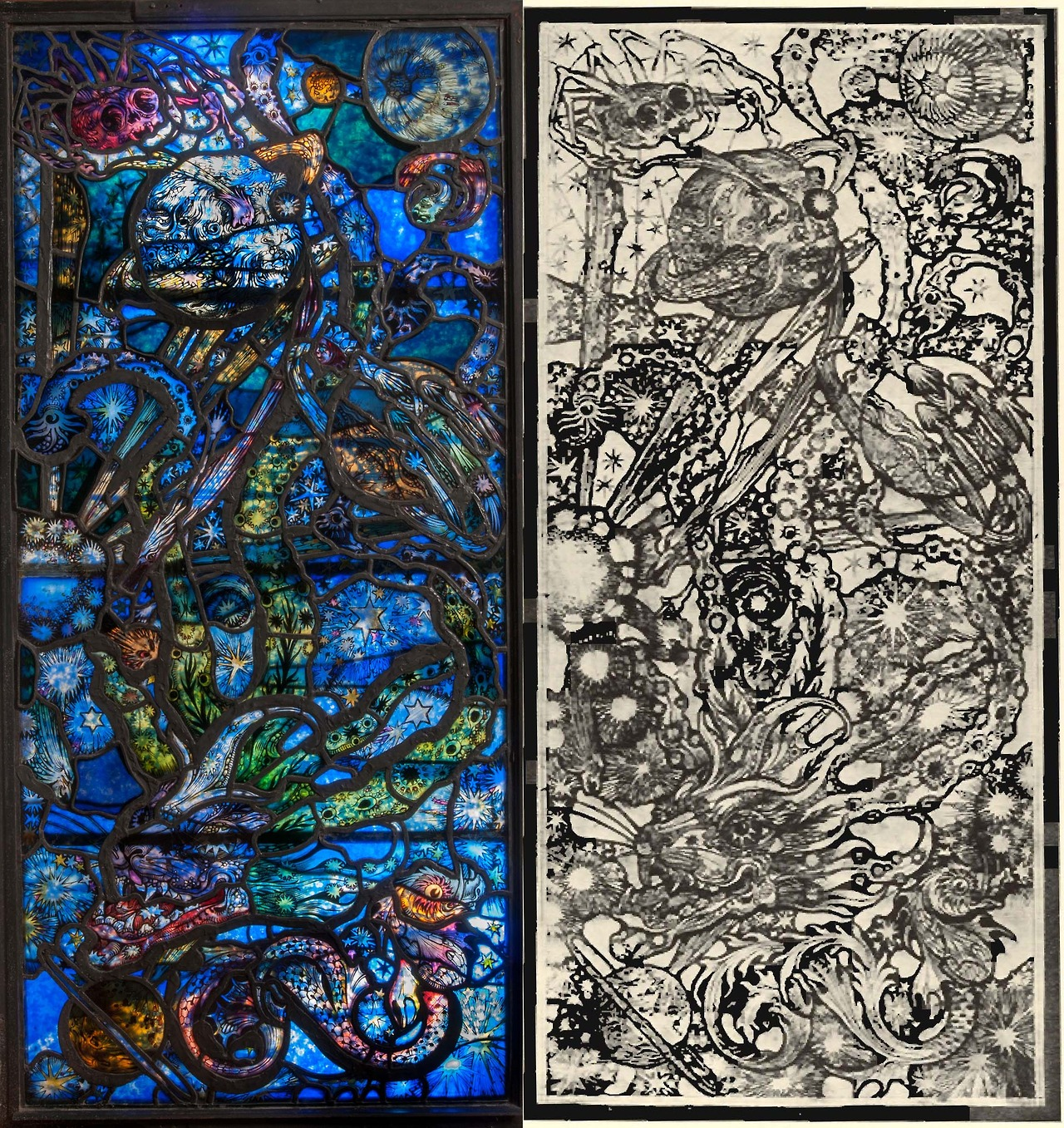
Robert Winthrop Chanler, stained glass window (one of seven, with a study drawing) in the Whitney Studio, New York City, 1918–1923, private collection

Like many women of her class, Mai Rogers Coe was a patron of artists and had a taste for the elaborate, decorative works of Robert Winthrop Chanler. He painted decorative murals in Mai Coe's bedroom (1921) and in the family's breakfast room, the Buffalo Room (1920).

In 1918, Gertrude Vanderbilt Whitney commissioned Chanler to create a set of seven stained glass windows for her sculpture studio on MacDougal Alley in Greenwich Village. She asked Chanler to decorate the entire space and over a period of five years, he created an immense chimney-piece of three-dimensional flames, floor to ceiling, in plaster with additional inserts of bronze blazes. He covered the entire ceiling with plaster constellations and then created the windows. Chanler also designed murals for Gertrude's studio in Greenvale, New York, including a seaworld fantasy in the bathroom. The studio is extant and privately owned.

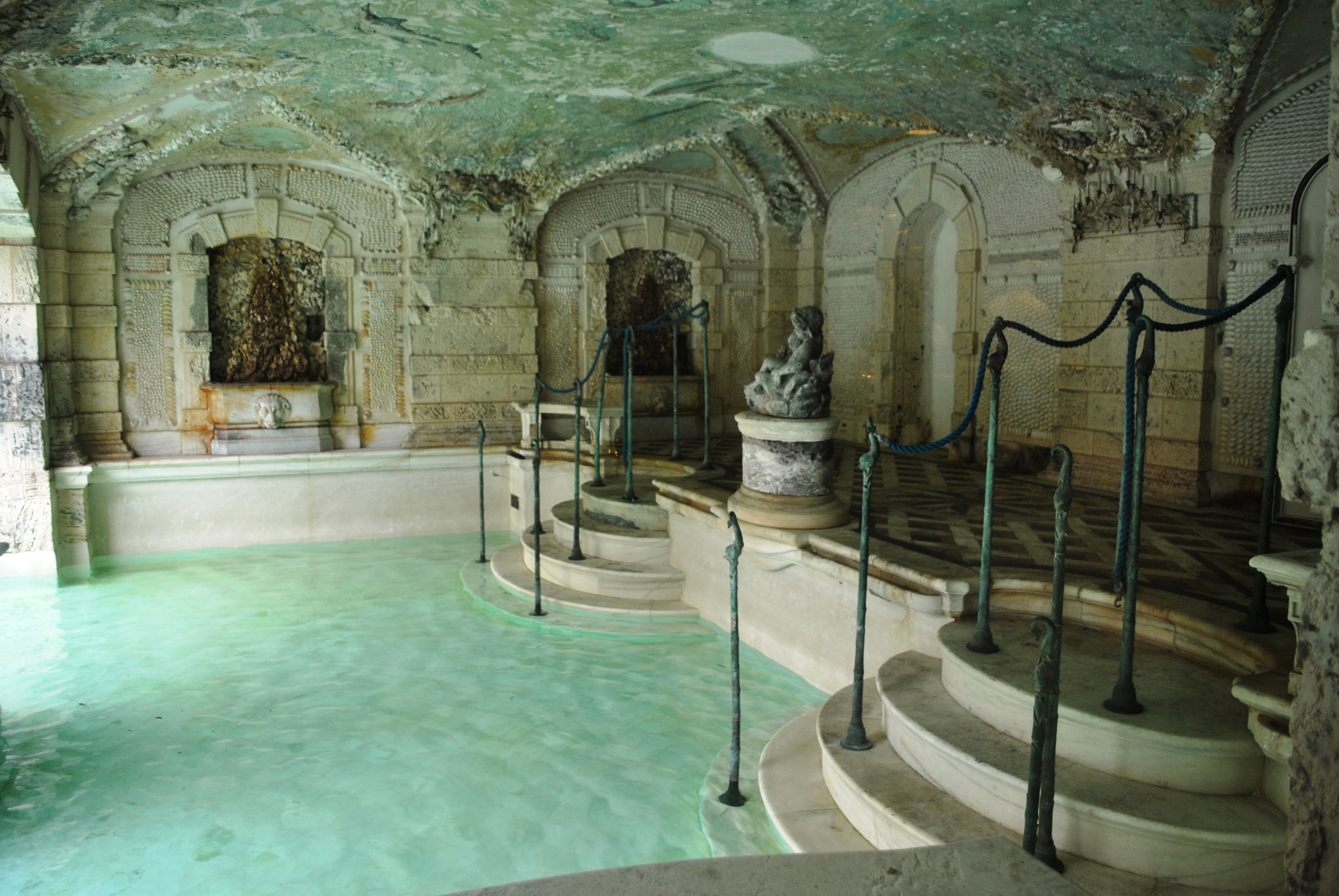
Chanler's murals at the Villa Vizcaya, 1916

Gertrude Vanderbilt and Mai Rogers Coe were perhaps Chanler's greatest patrons, but he received commissions from other wealthy families for decorative murals and screens. By 1920, when he completed the murals in the Buffalo Room, Chanler's work was well known. He later received favorable commentary in The Upholsterer and Interior Decorator magazine for his murals in Mai Coe's bedroom (1921) and in International Studio magazine for his painted screens (1922). Around this time, Chicago industrialist James Deering commissioned him to paint an "undersea fantasy" fresco on the ceiling of the indoor/outdoor swimming pool at Villa Vizcaya (1916–1925), Deering's winter home in Miami, Florida.

Chanler was close friends with Hervey White and a member of White's Woodstock artist colony in the early 1920s. White wrote of Chanler, "He could correlate his subjects in any period, the politics, sociology, and art. He could illustrate with the customs of the populace, he could give incidents for illustration of his points, then break off with a personal explanation of his conduct. He was a man of great emotion and great mind." Towards the end of his life, Chanler owned a house in Woodstock, where he exhibited his work in local exhibitions.

== Personal life ==
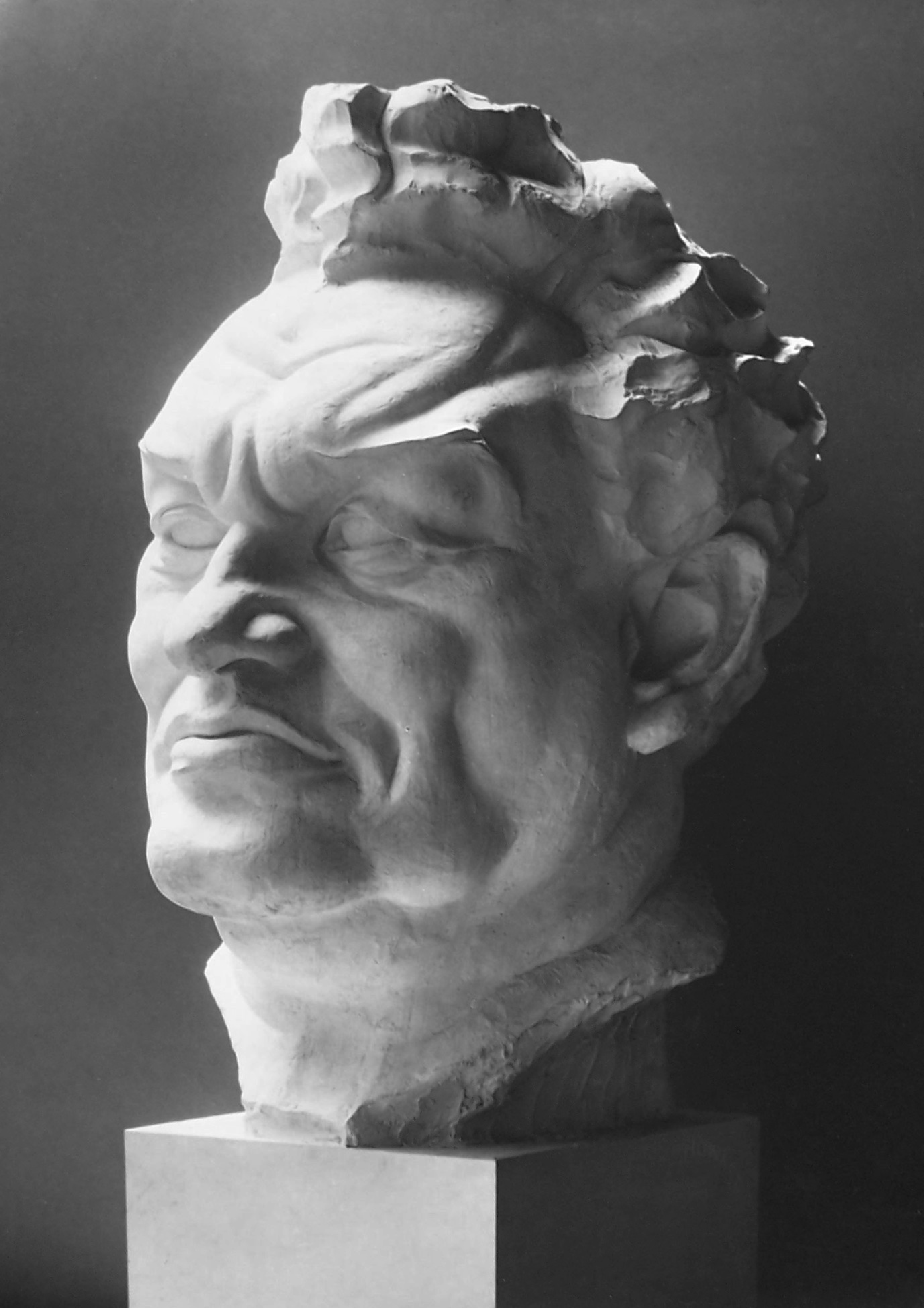
Plaster bust of Robert W. Chanler by Cecil de Blaquiere Howard, 1928

On April 12, 1893, he married Julia Remington Chamberlain, a daughter of William Chamberlain and Mary Bradhurst Remington. Julia's elder sister Alice was the first wife of Robert's elder brother Lewis. They had two daughters: Dorothy Chanler on November 24, 1898, and Julia Chanler on March 25, 1905.

The couple divorced on August 7, 1907. After his divorce from Julia, Chanler had a whirlwind romance with opera singer Natalina "Lina" Cavalieri. They married on June 18, 1910, but separated by the end of their honeymoon, and their divorce was finalized in June 1912. After the divorce, Lina returned to Europe, where she became a much-loved star in pre-Revolutionary St. Petersburg, Russia, and in Ukraine. Chanler died on October 24, 1930, at an art colony in Woodstock, New York, after being in a coma for 12 hours.

== Legacy ==
Chanler's work has been compared to the fantastical works of some renaissance painters. His works involve the use of sculpted gesso, transparent glazes, and gilded finishes to produce ornate and decorative designs. His work still exists in his family's estate, Rokeby near Barrytown, New York, the Luxembourg Museum, and in private collections across the country.

In 2010, Chanler's decorative plaster ceiling at the Gertrude Vanderbilt Whitney Studio was the focus of Lauren Drapala's Masters Thesis at the University of Pennsylvania. The ceiling, which had been painted over numerous times, was found to contain vivid colors amidst metallic overlays and glazes.

At Villa Vizcaya, Chanler chose to use materials such as plaster of Paris and water-soluble paint, despite the humid climate of Florida, and the work's location above a swimming pool. His murals and ceiling at Villa Vizcaya began to deteriorate soon after they were installed in 1917. The mural has even survived a hurricane in which the storm surge flooded the grotto, with debris scratching the ceiling. Extensive restoration of Chanler's murals and the painted plaster ceiling at Villa Vizcaya was begun in 2016. As of August 28, 2024, Vizcaya was awarded a $750,000 grant for conservation of the mural, as part of the Save America’s Treasures program of the National Park Service.
