= Hazard E. Reeves =

American cinema pioneer (1906–1986)

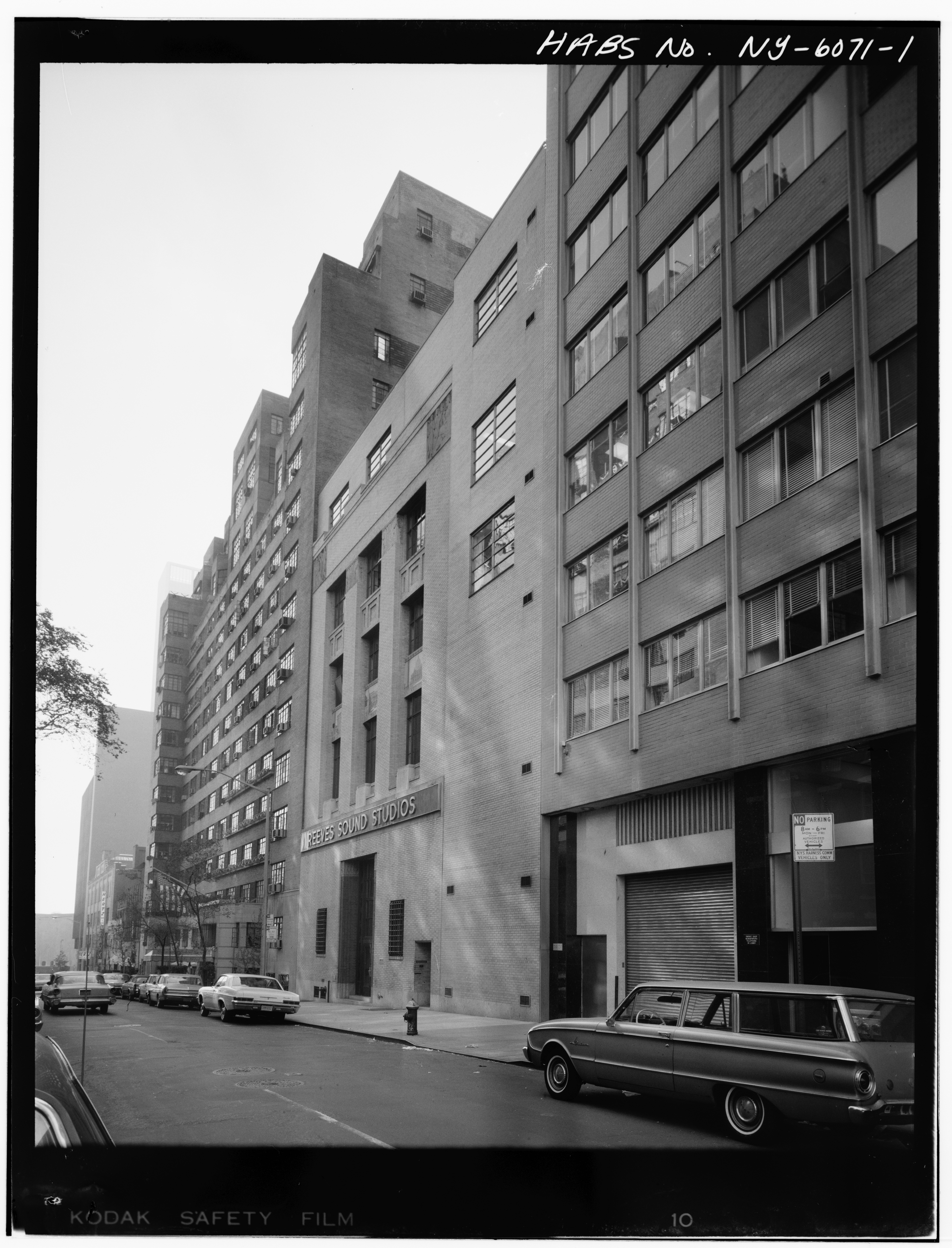
Reeves Sound Studios, undated, c. 1960s

Hazard Earle Reeves, Jr. (July 6, 1906 – December 23, 1986) was an American pioneer in sound and sound electronics, and introduced magnetic stereophonic sound to motion pictures. He was also the president of over 60 companies, including Cinerama Inc.

== Early life and education ==
Reeves was born in Baltimore, Maryland, the son of Susan (Perreyclear) and Hazard Earle Reeves. He graduated from Georgia School of Technology in 1928 with a degree in engineering.

== Early career and war ==
Reeves moved to New York, where his first job was for the Columbia Phonograph Company. After being appointed as a special consultant to the Harvard University Film Foundation, his interests shifted from phonograph recordings to motion picture audio. By 1933, Reeves had set up his own sound recording studio in New York. The studio soon became the largest on the east coast of the US.

In 1939, Reeves met Fred Waller during the construction of the 1939 New York World's Fair on an exhibit for Eastman Kodak. Waller showed Reeves his idea for a multiple-camera photography system that would fill the peripheral vision, initially dubbed "Vitarama". Waller asked Reeves if he could invent a multi-channel system of sound. Reeves agreed, and ultimately invested money into the company.

During World War II, Reeves ran the Reeves-Ely Laboratories, Inc. (R.E.L.), manufacturing electronic products for the war effort. His company won the Army-Navy "E" Award for merit four times, fulfilling contracts totaling millions of dollars.

== Later career ==
Originally also known as Reeves Sound Laboratory, following the war, in 1946, Reeves founded the Reeves Soundcraft Corporation (later known as Reeves Sound Services) and directed the operation of a number of companies manufacturing a variety of products including recording tape and film, record discs, wire cable, television tubes and cameras and precision recording equipment. Reeves introduced magnetic recording to the film industry in 1948.

Utilizing separate magnetic film, Reeves created a seven-channel sound system for Cinerama, the company of which he was president by 1952. That same year, Cinerama released its first picture, This is Cinerama. Reeves' sound system was the first discrete stereophonic sound system used in post-war commercial application. (Walt Disney had originally released Fantasia (1940) in three-track optical sound, but the Disney "Fantasound" system was not used for any other film afterwards.)

Reeves Soundcraft Corporation won an Academy Award in 1953 for their development of a process of applying stripes of magnetic oxide to motion picture film for sound recording and reproduction.

Reeves died at age 80 of a heart attack in Tuxedo Park, New York. One year after he died, Unitel Video bought the assets of his firm.

Reeves was married to Adeline Johnstone Fowles. Their granddaughter is actress Perrey Reeves.

== See also ==
- Reeves Instrument Corporation
- Reeves Teletape Studios
- Reeves Communications Corporation
- Reeves Entertainment Group
