= John Winthrop Chanler =

American politician

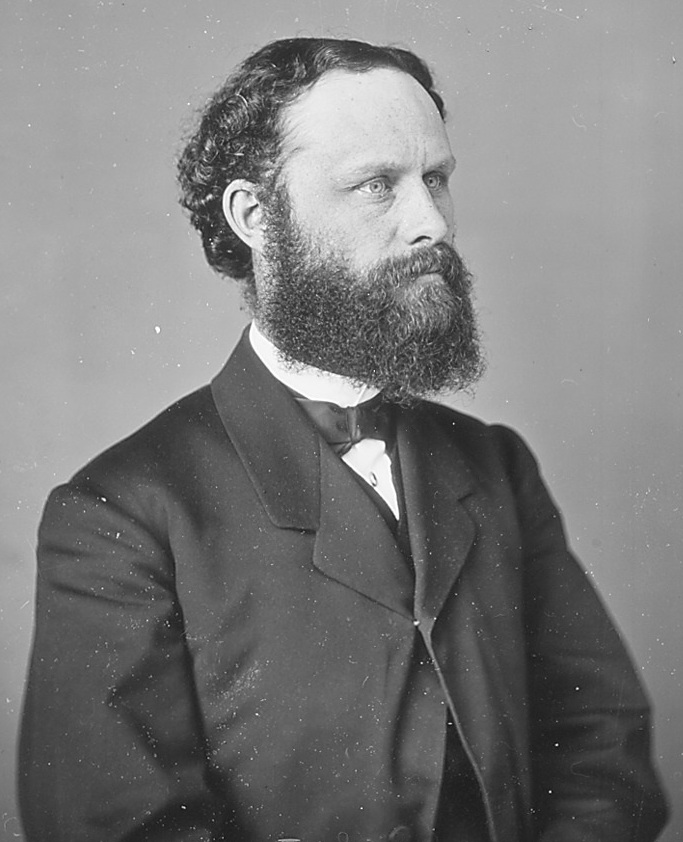

Member of the U.S. House of Representatives from New York's 7th district
- In office March 4, 1863 – March 3, 1869
- Preceded by: Elijah Ward
- Succeeded by: Hervey C. Calkin

Member of the New York Assembly from the 10th district
- In office 1858–1859
- Preceded by: James Sluyter
- Succeeded by: Joseph Cooper

Personal details
- Born: John Winthrop Chanler; September 14, 1826 New York City, New York, U.S.
- Died: October 19, 1877 (aged 51) Barrytown, New York, U.S.
- Resting place: Trinity Church Cemetery
- Party: Democratic
- Spouse: Margaret Astor Ward (m. 1862; died 1875)
- Relations: Stuyvesant family
- Children: 11, including John, William, Lewis, and Robert
- Education: Columbia University (BA); Heidelberg University

John Winthrop Chanler (September 14, 1826 – October 19, 1877) was a New York lawyer and a U.S. representative from New York. He was a member of the Stuyvesant family and married Margaret Astor Ward, a member of the Astor family.

== Early life ==
John Winthrop Chanler was born in New York City on September 14, 1826. He was the only son of the Rev. Dr. John White Chanler, an Episcopalian clergyman from Charleston, South Carolina, and Elizabeth Shirreff Winthrop, who was from the Stuyvesant family. His mother was a great-great-granddaughter of Wait Winthrop and Joseph Dudley and a great-great-great granddaughter of Peter Stuyvesant.

Chanler received his early education from private tutors, and graduated from Columbia College of Columbia University in 1847. He attended the University of Heidelberg, studied law, and was admitted to the New York State Bar in 1851.

== Career ==
A Democrat affiliated with Tammany Hall, Chanler was member of the New York State Assembly (New York Co., 10th D.) in 1858 and 1859. He was nominated for New York State Senate in 1860 but declined. He was an unsuccessful candidate for election in 1860 to the Thirty-seventh Congress, losing to the Mozart Hall Democrats, a rival faction to Tammany Hall led by mayor and former Tammany leader Fernando Wood.

=== United States Congress ===
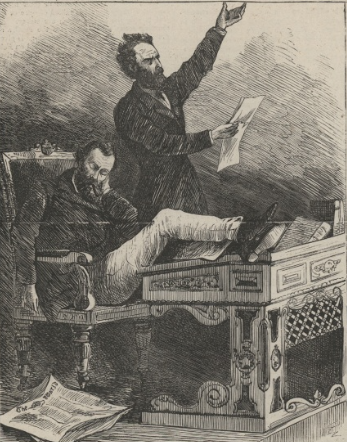
Illustration by Theodore R. Davis (published in Harper's Weekly) depicting Democratic Congressman Albert G. Burr (left) as sleeping while Chanler (right) delivers a loud speech during debate on the adoption of articles of impeachment in the impeachment of Andrew Johnson

Chanler was elected as a Democrat to the Thirty-eighth, Thirty-ninth, and Fortieth United States Congresses, serving from March 4, 1863 to March 3, 1869.

While in Congress, Chanler served on the Committee of Bankrupt Law, Committee on Patents, Committee on Southern Railroads.

He was known for his censure on May 14, 1866 for an insult to the House of Representatives. The censure stemmed from a resolution he introduced expressing support for the vetoes of President Andrew Johnson, in which Chanler called acts of Congress vetoed by Johnson "wicked and revolutionary," and called House members who overruled the vetoes "malignant and mischievous."

He was defeated in his reelection to the 41st Congress. Many observers attribute his defeat to his hostility to Boss Tweed.

=== Later career ===
After Tweed was overthrown from running Tammany Hall in 1871, Chanler became a Sachem and Chairman of the General Committee. He ultimately gave up the positions in 1875 due to his declining health.

== Family ==
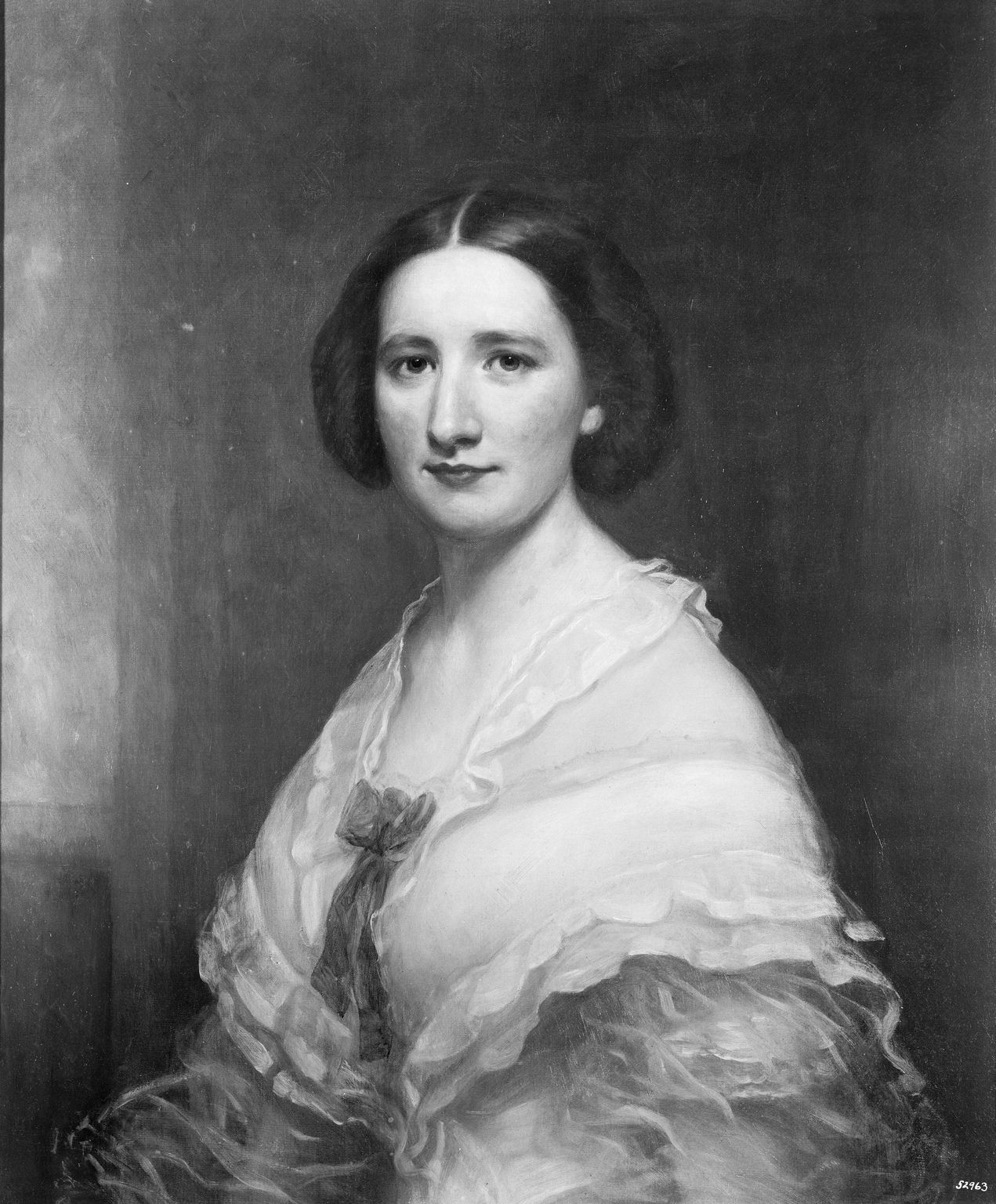
Margaret Astor Ward

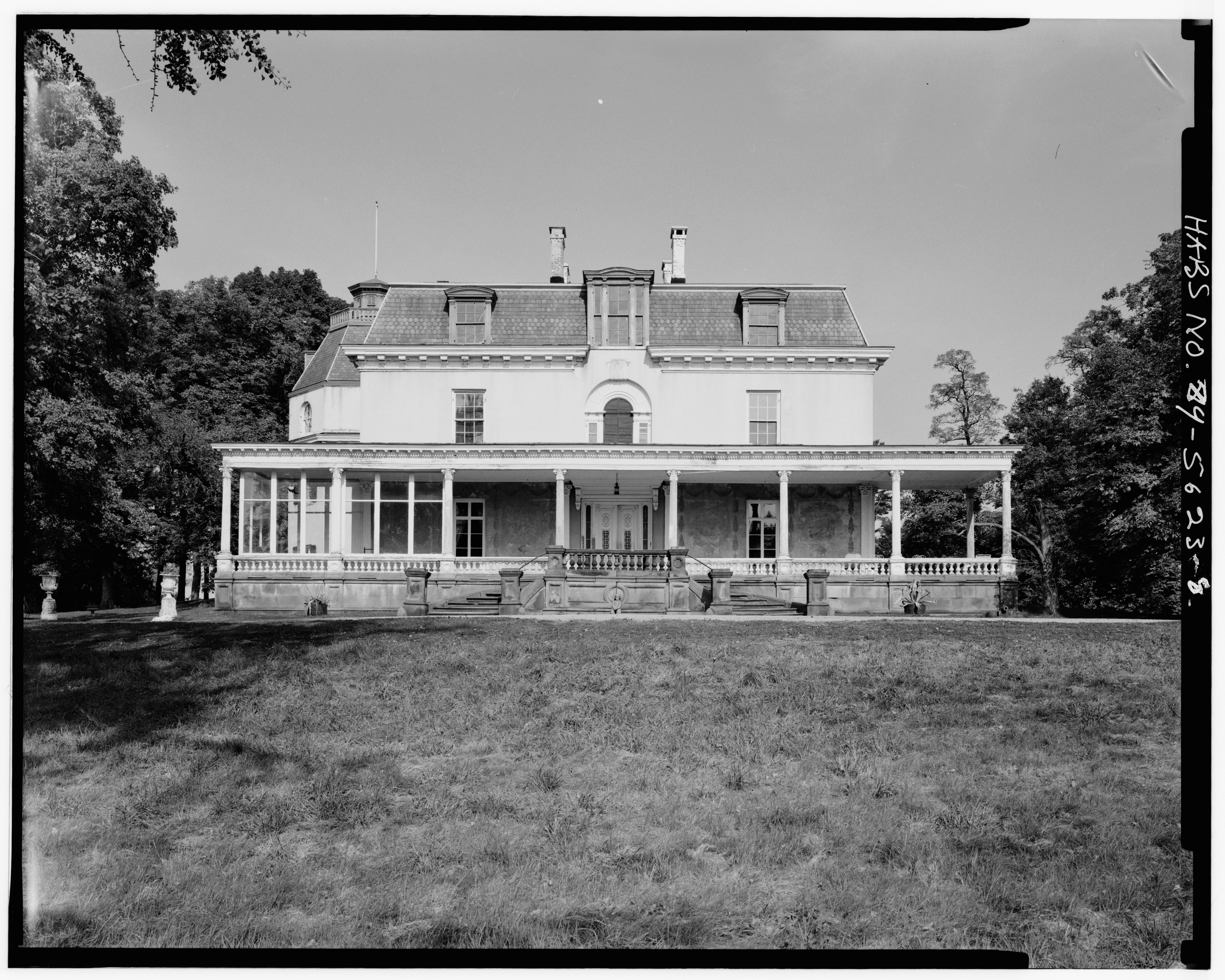
Rokeby, the Chanler family estate in Barrytown built in 1811 by John Armstrong Jr., Margaret's great-grandfather

In 1862, Chanler married Margaret Astor "Maddie" Ward, whose parents were Samuel Cutler Ward and Emily Astor of the Astor family. She was also a granddaughter of Samuel Ward III and William Backhouse Astor Sr. as well as a great-granddaughter of Samuel Ward Jr., John Jacob Astor, and John Armstrong Jr. Together, John and Margaret had eleven children:

- John Armstrong "Archie" Chanler (1862–1935), who married and later divorced novelist Amélie Rives Troubetzkoy (1863–1945).
- Winthrop Astor "Wintie" Chanler (1863–1926), who married Margaret Louisa "Daisy" Terry (1862–1952) in 1886.
- Emily Astor Chanler (1864–1872) who died of scarlet fever
- Elizabeth Astor Winthrop Chanler (1866–1937), who married John Jay Chapman (1862–1933) in 1899.
- William Astor "Willie" Chanler (1867–1934), a politician, soldier, and explorer who married Beatrice "Minnie" Ashley (1878–1946)
- Marion Ward Chanler (1868–1883)
- Lewis Stuyvesant Chanler (1869–1942), a politician who married Alice Chamberlain (1868–1955) in 1890. After their divorce, he married Julia Lynch Olin (1882–1961) in 1921.
- Margaret Livingston Chanler (1870–1963), who served as a nurse with the American Red Cross during the Spanish–American War and who married Richard Aldrich (1863–1937) in 1906.
- Robert Winthrop Chanler (1872–1930), an artist who married Julia Remington (1872–1936). After their divorce in 1907, he married Natalina "Lina" Cavalieri (1874–1944)
- Alida Beekman Chanler (1873–1969), who married Christopher Temple Emmet (1868–1957).
- Egerton White Chanler (1874–1882), who died of a brain tumor

Margaret died of pneumonia in December 1875 shortly after attending the funeral of William Backhouse Astor Sr. She was buried at Trinity Church Cemetery in New York City. In her will, she left $55,000 (equivalent to $1,612,500 in 2025 dollars) to her husband, $1,000 (equivalent to $29,318 in 2025 dollars) a year to her father, and the rest to be divided among her children.

=== Death and burial ===
John Winthrop Chanler died at his "Rokeby" estate in Barrytown, New York, also of pneumonia, on October 19, 1877. His funeral was attended by New York Mayor Smith Ely Jr., Hamilton Fish, William Backhouse Astor Jr., John Jacob Astor III, John Reilly, John Kean, Van Horn Stuyvesant, Dr. Austin Flint, and Hamilton Fish, Jr. His pallbearers were Smith Ely, George Warren Dresser, Sidney Webster, Tompkins Westervelt, Carlile Pollock Patterson, Frederic W. Rhinelander, John W. Ehrlinger, and Walter Langdon. He was interred with his wife in the Trinity Church Cemetery in New York City.

=== Estate ===
According to John Winthrop Chanler's will, his estate was valued between $1,500,000 (equivalent to $45,351,563) and $2,000,000 (equivalent to $60,468,750 in 2025 dollars). The executors were Lewis Morris Rutherfurd, Franklin Hughes Delano, Rutherfurd Stuyvesant, and Tompkins Westervelt. His eldest son, John Armstrong, inherited Rokeby with all its stock, books, pictures, furniture, and personal property of all kinds, $100,000 (equivalent to $3,023,438 in 2025 dollars) on reaching the age of majority, all of his real estate in Dutchess County, and a lot of land in Newport, Rhode Island known as "Cliff Lawn." To Winthrop Astor, he left all the personal property in his New York City home, located at 192 Madison Avenue, all of his real estate in Delaware County, and a house on Cliff Lawn in Newport. To his daughters, Elizabeth, Margaret, and Alida, he gave all of their mother's jewelry, and a lot in Newport for each of them, as well as to his sons William Astor, Marion Ward, Lewis Stuyvesant, Robert Winthrop, and Egerton White. In addition, the will provided $20,000 (equivalent to $604,688 in 2025 dollars) a year for each child for life, enough to live comfortably by the standards of the time.

=== Electoral history ===
New York's 6th congressional district election, 1860
Party	Candidate	Votes	%
Republican	Frederick A. Conkling	6,536	35.1
Independent Democrat	John Cochrane (incumbent)	6,360	34.16
Democratic	John W. Chanler	5,724	30.74
Total votes		18,620	100.00
Republican gain from Democratic			

New York's 7th congressional district election, 1862
Party	Candidate	Votes	%
Democratic	John W. Chanler	9,366	76.13
National Union	Henry A. Burr	2,937	23.87
Total votes		12,303	100.00
Democratic hold			

New York's 7th congressional district election, 1864
Party	Candidate	Votes	%
Democratic	John W. Chanler (incumbent)	11,513	67.13
National Union	William Boardman	5,638	32.87
Total votes		17,151	100.00
Democratic hold			

New York's 7th congressional district election, 1866
Party	Candidate	Votes	%
Democratic	John W. Chanler (incumbent)	11,503	63.04
Republican	George F. Steinbrenner	6,734	36.96
Total votes		18,237	100.00
Democratic hold			

== See also ==
- List of United States representatives expelled, censured, or reprimanded

New York State Assembly
Preceded by James Sluyter	Member of the New York Assembly from the 10th district 1858–1859	Succeeded by Joseph Cooper
U.S. House of Representatives
Preceded by Hervey C. Calkin	Member of the U.S. House of Representatives from New York's 7th congressional district 1863–1869	Succeeded by Elijah Ward
