= Richard Aldrich (music critic) =

American music critic and journalist

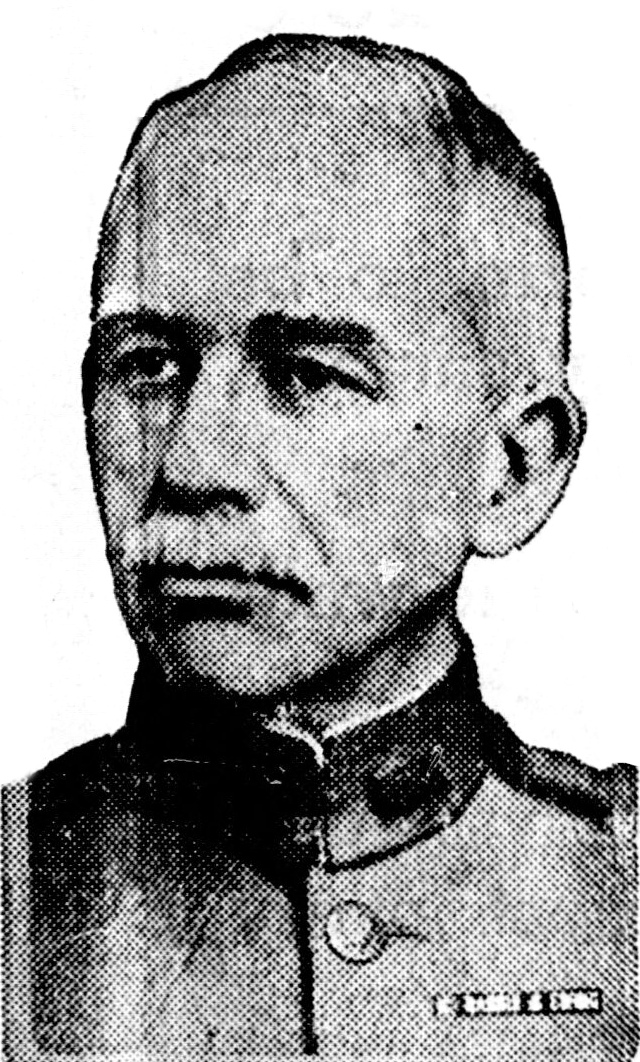
- Aldrich c. 1918
- Born: July 31, 1863; Providence, Rhode Island, U.S.
- Died: June 2, 1937 (aged 73); Rome, Italy
- Education: Providence High School; Harvard College
- Occupation: Music critic
- Spouse: Margaret Livingston Chanler (m. 1906)
- Children: 2
- Relatives: Chester Holmes Aldrich (brother)

Richard Aldrich (July 31, 1863 – June 2, 1937) was an American music critic. From 1902–23, he was music critic for The New York Times.

== Early life ==
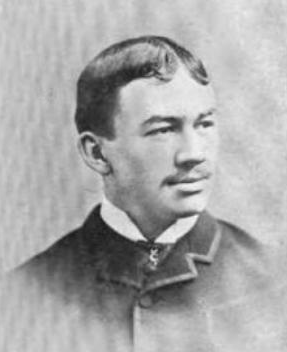
At Harvard, c. 1885

Richard Aldrich was born on July 31, 1863, in Providence, Rhode Island. His father was Elisha S. Aldrich and his mother, Anna E. Gladding. He attended Providence High School and graduated with an A.B. in 1885 from Harvard College, where he had studied music.

== Career ==
He began his journalistic career on the Providence Journal. From 1889 to 1891, he was private secretary to Senator Nathan F. Dixon III in Washington, D.C., writing criticisms for the Washington Evening Star. In 1891–92 he was with the New York Tribune in various editorial capacities, assisting Henry Edward Krehbiel with musical criticisms. He was associated with Krehbiel as an American contributor to the revised edition of Grove's Dictionary of Music and Musicians.

== Personal life ==
In 1906, he was married to Margaret Livingston Chanler, daughter of John Winthrop Chanler (1826–1877) of the Dudley–Winthrop family and Margaret Astor Ward (1838–1875) of the Astor family. Margaret Livingston Chanler served as a nurse with the American Red Cross during the Spanish–American War. They had two children, a daughter and a son:

- Margaret Aldrich (1911-2011), who married Christopher Rand in 1934. She later married Byron DeMott (d. 1963).
- Richard Chanler Aldrich (1909-1961), who married Susan Cutler (d. 1998), the daughter of John Wilson Cutler and Rosalind (née Fish) Cutler, and the granddaughter of Hamilton Fish II.

Aldrich died on June 2, 1937, in Rome, Italy.

== Publications ==
- Guide to Parsifal (Ditson, 1904)
- Guide to the Ring of the Nibelung (Ditson, 1905)
- Translator of Lilli Lehmann's How to Sing (Macmillan 1912)
- Musical Discourse (1928)
- Concert Life in New York 1902–1923 (1941)
