= Margaret Chanler Aldrich =

American nurse and author

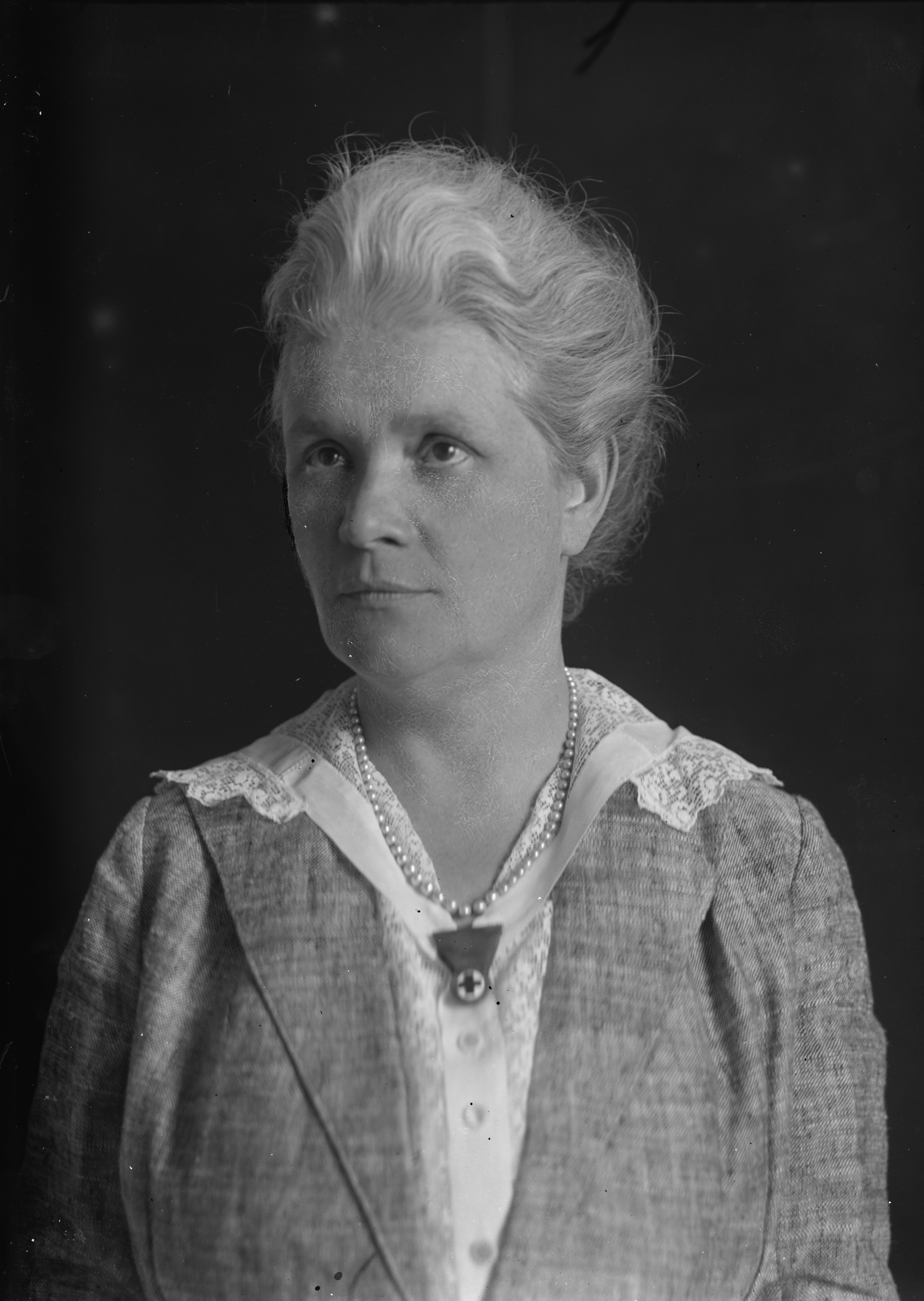
- Aldrich, c. 1919
- Born: Margaret Livingston Chanler; October 31, 1870; New York County, New York, U.S.
- Died: March 19, 1963 (aged 92); Red Hook, New York, U.S.
- Occupations: Philanthropist, poet, nurse and advocate
- Known for: Owner of Rokeby

Margaret Livingston Aldrich, (née Chanler; October 31, 1870 – March 19, 1963), also known as Angel of Puerto Rico, was an American philanthropist, poet, nurse, and woman's suffrage advocate. She was also a member of the Astor family and owned Rokeby in Barrytown, New York after purchasing it from her siblings. Aldrich was the daughter of John Winthrop Chanler and the wife of Richard Aldrich.

== Life ==
Aldrich was born Margaret Livingston Chanler on October 31, 1870, in Manhattan to John Winthrop Chanler, an attorney and U.S. Representative from New York, and Margaret Astor Chanler (née Ward). Her maternal grandparents were Samuel Cutler Ward and Emily Astor, a member of the Astor family and daughter of William Backhouse Astor Sr.

She served as a nurse with the American Red Cross during the Spanish–American War and Philippine–American War, travelling to the Philippines, Cuba, and Puerto Rico, where she organized the care and treatment of wounded soldiers, for which she received a gold medal from Congress. She helped pass a 1901 bill establishing the Women's Army Nursing Corps and later served as an advocate for rural nursing, encouraging community members to support nurses.

== Personal life ==
Later in life, she wrote of the family in her memoirs, Family Vista (1958). A proponent of women's suffrage, she was a past president of the Protestant Episcopal Woman's Suffrage Association. In 1906, Chanler married Richard Aldrich, with whom she had two children.

- Richard Chanler Aldrich (May 16, 1909 - November 5, 1961)
- Margaret "Maddie" Aldrich (November 11, 1910 - April 25, 2011), married Byron A. DeMott of Santa Barbara, California.

Margaret Aldrich purchased from her siblings the family estate Rokeby in Barrytown, New York, where she started a dairy farm. As of 2019, the property remains with her descendants.
