= Charaxes chanleri =

Scientific classification
- Domain: Eukaryota
- Kingdom: Animalia
- Phylum: Arthropoda
- Class: Insecta
- Order: Lepidoptera
- Family: Nymphalidae
- Genus: Charaxes
- Species: C. chanleri

Binomial name
- Charaxes chanleri Holland, 1896

Species of butterfly

Charaxes chanleri is a butterfly in the family Nymphalidae. It is found in north-central and northern Kenya and southern Ethiopia. The habitat consists of arid Acacia savanna.

== Original description ==
In 1895, William Jacob Holland wrote:

Charaxes chanleri, new species.

This species comes nearer to C. kirkii, Butler, than any other, but maybe distinguished from that species by the fact that the secondaries [hindwings] have no red inclosed spots or curved dashes in the first four divisions of the marginal markings, as described by Dr. Butler; the submarginal series of lunulate spots are not white edged, as in Kirkii, and there is no discal lunulate green line as in Dr. Butler's species. The primaries [forewings], moreover, are not shot with steel blue at the base.

Expanse of wings, 65 mm.

Four damaged males of this species in the National Museum collection. The species is allied to C. guderiana, Dewitz, resembling the latter in the form of the wings.

Vingerhoedt provides images

== Taxonomy ==
Considered conspecific with Charaxes kirki kirkii by Turlin and Vingerhoedt.

== Etymology ==
It was named for William A. Chanler, one of the collectors.

== Realm ==
Afrotropical realm
