= William A. Chanler =

American politician and explorer (1867–1934)

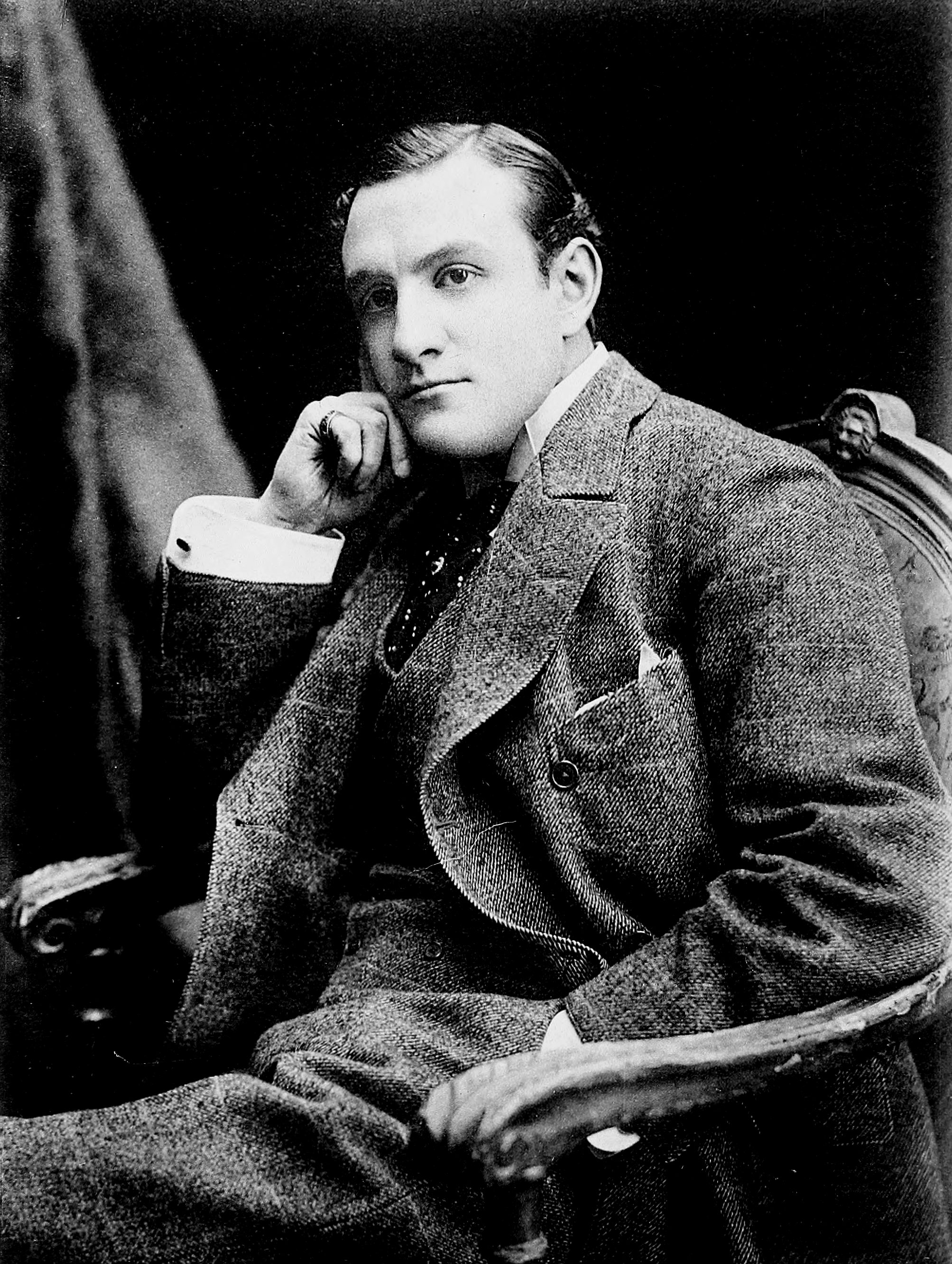
- Chanler in 1896

Member of the U.S. House of Representatives from New York's 14th district
- In office March 4, 1899 – March 3, 1901
- Preceded by: Lemuel E. Quigg
- Succeeded by: William H. Douglas

Member of the New York State Assembly from the 5th New York County district
- In office January 1, 1898 – December 31, 1898
- Preceded by: Richard Van Cott
- Succeeded by: Nelson H. Henry

Personal details
- Born: William Astor Chanler; June 11, 1867 Newport, Rhode Island, U.S.
- Died: March 4, 1934 (aged 66) Menton, Alpes-Maritimes, French Third Republic
- Resting place: Trinity Church Cemetery
- Party: Democratic
- Spouse: Minnie Ashley (m. 1903; sep. 1909)
- Relations: Astor family; Stuyvesant family
- Children: William Astor Chanler Jr. Sidney Ashley Chanler
- Parent(s): John Winthrop Chanler; Margaret Astor Ward
- Education: Harvard University
- Occupation: Politician; soldier; explorer
- Known for: Exploration of East Africa, military exploits in Cuba, Libya, and Somalia

William Astor Chanler (June 11, 1867 – March 4, 1934) was an American soldier, explorer, and politician who served as U.S. Representative from New York. He was a member of the Astor family and the Stuyvesant family. After spending several years exploring East Africa, he embarked on a brief political career. Chanler regarded it as an American obligation to be on the side of the people who fought for their independence, and during his life he participated in rebellions and independence struggles in Cuba, Libya, and Somalia. He provided support for insurgents in Venezuela, Turkey, and China. He maintained an active lifestyle even after losing his right leg in 1915. Late in life, he became a novelist and an outspoken antisemite.

== Family and early life ==
Born in Newport, Rhode Island, Chanler was third son of John Winthrop Chanler (1826–1877) of the Stuyvesant family and Margaret Astor Ward (1838–1875) of the Astor family. Through his father, he was a great-great-great-great-great-grandson of Peter Stuyvesant and a great-great-great-great-grandson of Wait Winthrop and Joseph Dudley. Through his mother, he was a grandnephew of Julia Ward Howe (1819–1910), John Jacob Astor III (1822–1890), and William Backhouse Astor, Jr. (1829–1892).

Chanler had ten brothers and sisters, including the politician Lewis Stuyvesant Chanler and the artist Robert Winthrop Chanler. His younger sister Margaret Livingston Chanler served as a nurse with the American Red Cross during the Spanish–American War. William's older brother Winthrop Astor Chanler served in the Rough Riders in Cuba and was wounded at the Battle of Tayacoba. His eldest brother John Armstrong "Archie" Chanler married novelist Amélie Louise Rives. His older sister Elizabeth Astor Winthrop Chanler married author John Jay Chapman.

Chanler and his siblings became orphans after the death of their mother in December 1875 and their father in October 1877, both to pneumonia. The children were raised at their parents' Rokeby Estate in Barrytown, New York. John Winthrop Chanler's will provided $20,000 a year for each child for life (equivalent to $470,563 in 2018 dollars), enough to live comfortably by the standards of the time.

=== Education ===
Chanler attended St. John's Military Academy in Ossining, New York, then Phillips Exeter Academy in Exeter, New Hampshire, and Harvard University, which he left on his twenty-first birthday in 1888, after he completed his sophomore year. While a student there he was a member of Delta Kappa Epsilon and elected to the Porcellian Club. Harvard later awarded him an honorary master's degree in 1895.

== Marriage and children ==
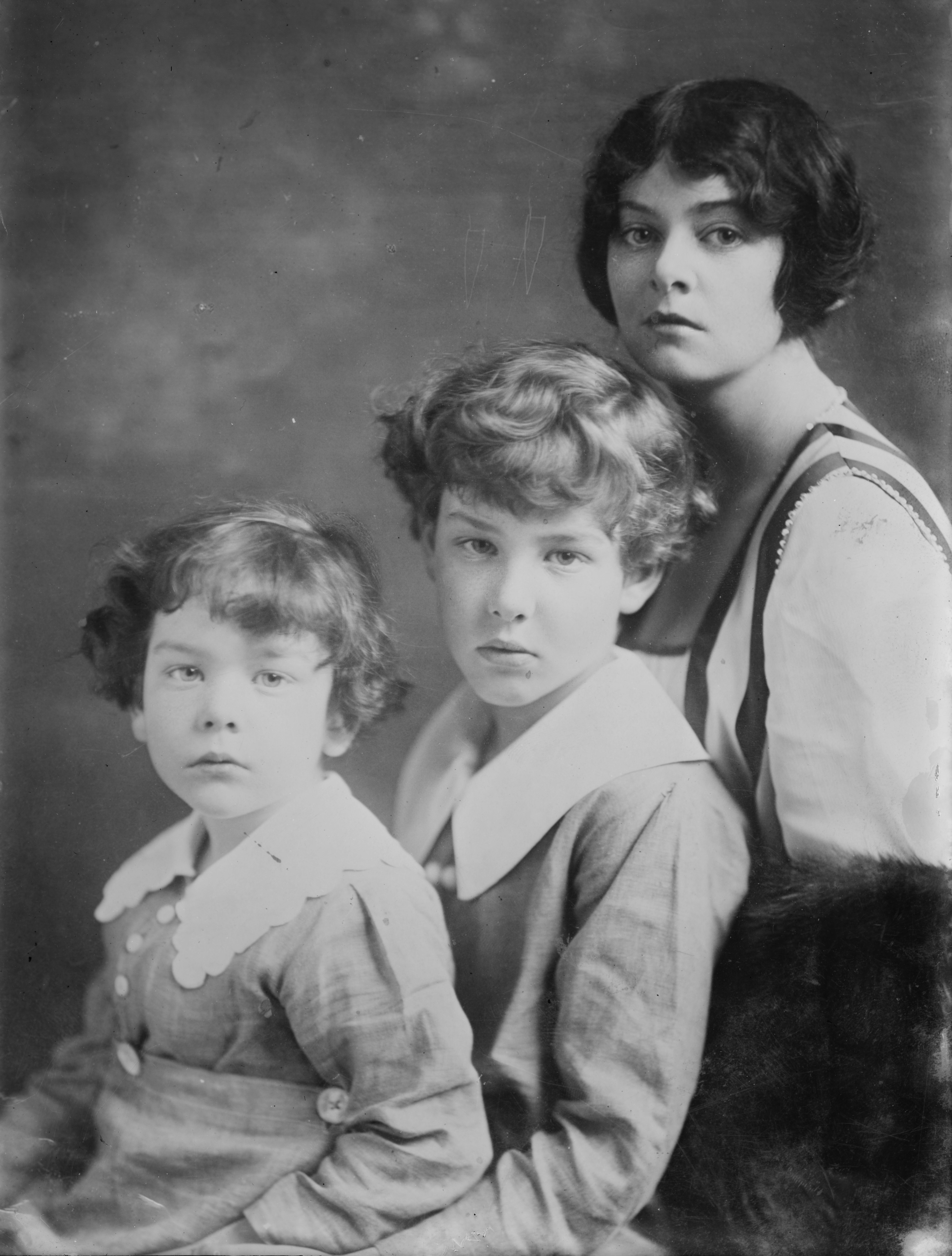
Chanler's wife Beatrice Ashley with their two sons circa 1910–1915

Chanler enjoyed theater, and in 1902 he saw actress Beatrice Ashley in a production of A Country Girl starring C. Hayden Coffin at Augustin Daly's theater in London. Ashley was already well known after appearing in John Philip Sousa's operetta El Capitan (1896) starring DeWolf Hopper, as well as The Geisha (1896), The Circus Girl (1897), A Greek Slave (1899) and San Toy (1900 and 1902).

Ashley was anxious to quit her stage career due to damage to her eyesight resulting from prolonged exposure to theatrical arc lights. After a brief courtship, she married Chanler on December 4, 1903, at St. George's Episcopal Church in Manhattan. They had two sons:

- William Astor Chanler, Jr. (1904–2002), published historian
- Sidney Ashley Chanler (1907–1994), public relations executive who in 1934 married Princess Maria Antonia of Braganza, daughter of the Duke of Braganza and Princess Maria Theresa of Löwenstein-Wertheim-Rosenberg.

He and Beatrice separated on good terms in 1909.

Beatrice Ashley became an author and a sculptor, studying under George Gray Barnard. She was president of two relief organizations, the Friends of Greece and the Committee of Mercy, and also managed the French Heroes Lafayette Memorial Fund. For her philanthropic work she was decorated as a Chevalier of the Legion of Honour and was awarded (posthumously) the Greek Order of the Phoenix.

== African explorations ==
=== Visit to Kilimanjaro, 1889 ===
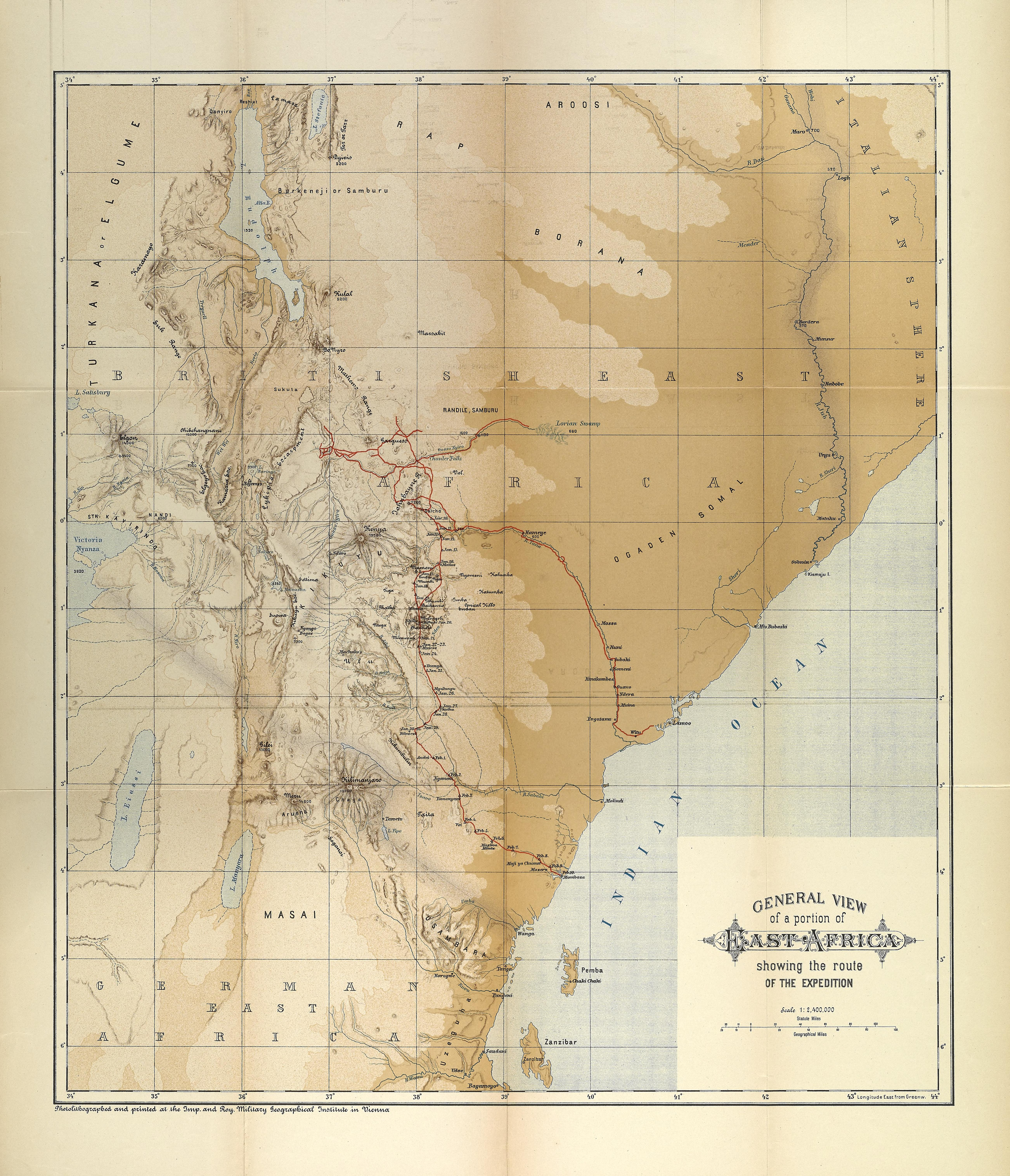
Map of East Africa exploration journey made by Chanler and von Höhnel, 1892–1894. From Through Jungle and Desert (1896).

A Fellow of the Royal Geographical Society of London, of the Imperial and Royal Geographical Society of Austria, and of the American Geographical Society of New York, Chanler first visited Africa in May 1889 in the company of his friends George Galvin (then only 15 years old) and Royal Phelps Carroll. They traveled to Zanzibar and then to the coast of Kenya, going overland to Tsavo and then through lands inhabited by the Taveta people, where they encountered ornithologist William Louis Abbott and geologist Hans Meyer. They continued into Maasai territory to explore the area around Mount Kilimanjaro. Chanler took with him a state-of-the-art Kodak camera designed to take four thousand photos without reloading, but upon his return it was discovered that the camera had not been properly loaded with film. He and Galvin traveled to Europe in November 1889 and arrived in New York in May 1890.

After returning to the US, Chanler visited Wyoming in 1890 and became friends with Butch Cassidy, who escorted him to the Hole-in-the-Wall bandit hideout.

=== Journey with Ludwig von Höhnel, 1892–1894 ===
Between 1892 and 1894 he explored the territory in the vicinity of Mount Kenya with George Galvin and Ludwig von Höhnel, a lieutenant in the Austro-Hungarian Navy. Departing from Mkunumbi on September 18, 1892, they proceeded inland from the coast, mapping the Guasso Nyiro River, the Lorian Swamp, the Tana River, Lake Rudolph and then Lake Stefanie. They were the first westerners to come into contact with the Bantu Tigania and Igembe Meru in this region (Carl Peters had passed to the south in 1889). On January 30, 1893, they were attacked by some 200 warriors of the Wamsara (a subgroup of the Meru), who retreated after killing three porters.

In early February the expedition was stranded in what is now the Meru North District of Kenya because of the death of all of its 165 pack animals (probably due to trypanosomiasis) and the desertion of many of the 160 porters. On August 24, 1893, von Höhnel was gored by a rhinoceros in the groin and lower abdomen and was forced to return to Austria. Chanler himself came close to death from malaria before he finally succeeded in reaching Mombasa in February 1894. Out of about five hundred photos taken during the journey, 155 photographs taken by von Höhnel have survived.

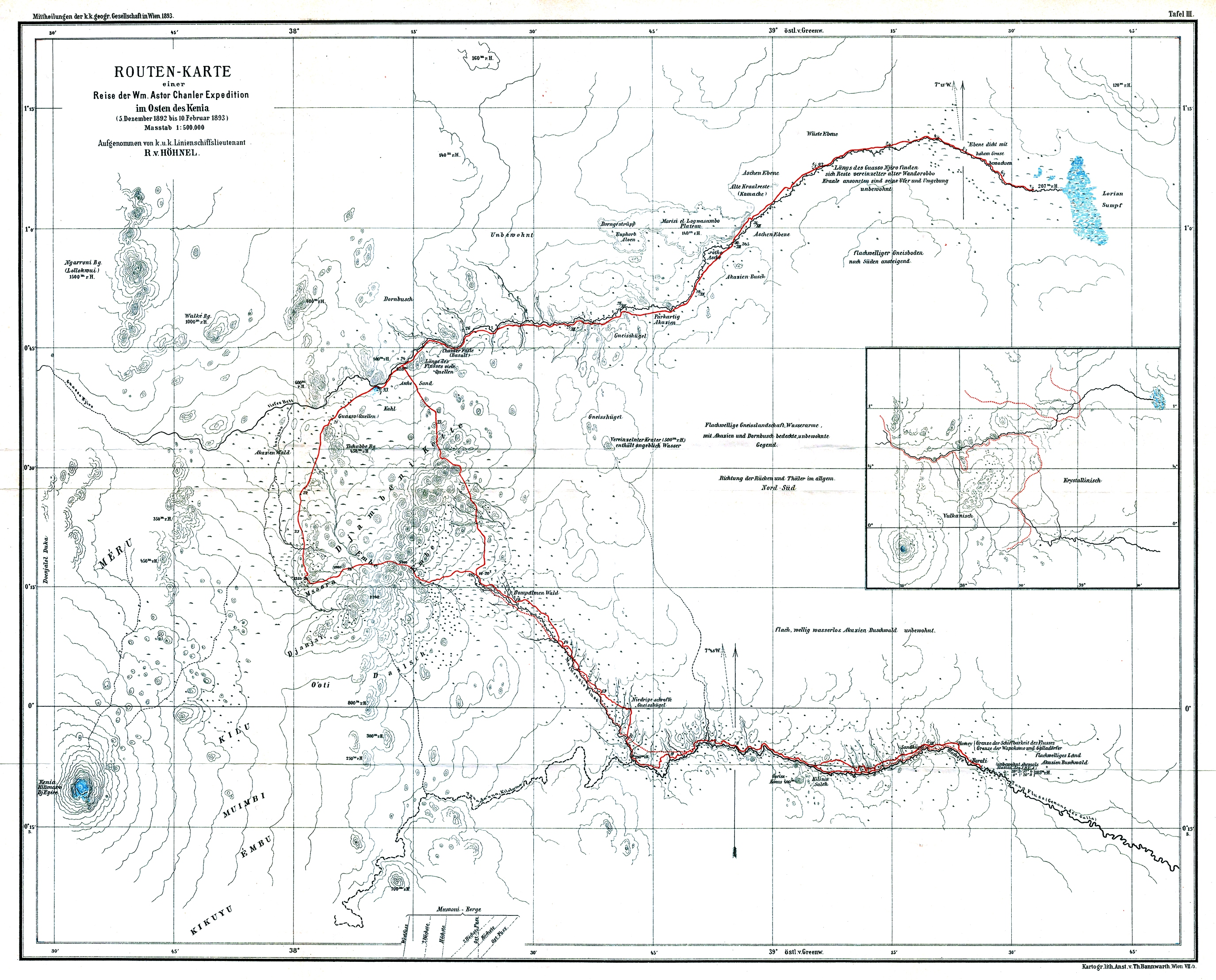
Von Höhnel's map of his and Chanler's 1892–93 journey in East Africa, showing Chanler's Falls.

As part of the scientific contribution of the journey, Chanler collected numerous specimens of plants, animals and insects, including several new species of butterflies (Charaxes chanleri, Planema chanleri, Ypthima chanleri, and Cypholoba chanleri) and a small crocodile. Many of the African animals in the American Museum of Natural History were donated by him after being collected on this expedition. Chanler's Falls on the Ewaso Ng'iro River and Chanler's Mountain Reedbuck (Redunca fulvorufula chanleri) were named for him. In 1896, Chanler published the first ethnographic description of the Cushitic Rendille, a community he would describe as "the most original and interesting of all the strange and different peoples met in East Africa".

In the course of his African explorations Chanler became fluent in the Swahili language.

Although von Höhnel and Chanler remained lifelong friends, von Höhnel considered Chanler to be reckless:

It did not take me long to find out what an enterprising, high-spirited American Mr. Chanler was, and I realized that on this expedition I would have to be the mother of wisdom. Later on it was indeed a sight to watch my young traveling companion running risks that were not always commensurate with the object to be achieved. He often needed to be cautioned.

During this expedition, Chanler and von Höhnel explored over 2,500 square miles (6,500 km^{2}) of previously unmapped territory, fixed the exact position of Mount Kenya. He was the first White man to view the Nyambeni hills, Chanler's Falls, and the Lorian Swamp, and mapped the course of the Ewaso Ng'iro River. Five specimens donated to the Smithsonian were previously unknown species, including two species of butterflies, two species of reptiles, and Chanler's Mountain Reedbuck.

== Political and military career ==
Chanler was a delegate to the Democratic State Convention at Saratoga Springs, New York, in 1896 and in 1897; and was a member of the New York State Assembly (New York County, 5th Assembly District) in 1898. He worked enthusiastically to pass bills concerning the Sunday closing law for New York City saloons and amending the code regulating prize fights.

A fervent supporter of the Cuban struggle for independence, Chanler wrote to his friend von Höhnel in early 1898:

I sympathize with the Cubans in their gallant efforts on behalf of liberty and I, being an American, feel it necessary to do what I can to separate entirely this continent from Europe."

In February 1898 he took a leave of absence in order to accompany a shipment of weapons and ammunition to the Caribbean together with Emilio Núñez. Among the guns were two M1895 Colt-Browning machine guns that Chanler had donated (Rubens states that they were Maxim-Nordenfelt guns). After the sinking of the USS Maine, when it appeared certain that war would break out, Chanler offered to resign from the assembly and was granted an indefinite leave of absence. In May 1898 Chanler was elected a sachem of the Tammany Society.

=== Participation in the Spanish–American War ===
In April 1898, at the outset of the Spanish–American War, Chanler responded to President William McKinley's call for volunteers by forming a New York regiment, with the encouragement of Theodore Roosevelt, who was hoping to lead it as lieutenant colonel. Known as the "Tammany Regiment," it was to be equipped at Chanler's expense. In early May, Governor Frank S. Black informed Chanler that the volunteer quota had already been reached by the 1st U. S. Volunteer Cavalry Regiment and that the army was unwilling to accept volunteer infantry, although Chanler speculated that it was in fact a politically motivated move. Most of these men went on to serve in "Chanler's Rough Riders," led by Chanler's older brother Winthrop.

Chanler immediately volunteered his services to General Máximo Gómez and was given the rank of colonel in the nascent indigenous Cuban Army. Chanler selected ten men skilled in scouting and took them to Tampa, Florida in preparation for transport to Cuba. The group included Chanler's brother Winthrop Astor Chanler, his brother-in-law C. Temple Emmet, his friend George Galvin, fellow explorer Dr. William Louis Abbott, war correspondent (later Lieutenant) Grover Flint, and the German surgeon Dr. Maximilian Lund, as well as a grandson of General Hood, a great-grandson of Daniel Boone, and two former members of Buffalo Bill's Wild West Show.

On May 10, 1898, while Chanler was in Tampa, he was offered a commission as captain and assistant adjutant general on the staff of Major General Joseph Wheeler, which he accepted. He served as acting ordnance officer, Cavalry Division, Fifth Army Corps, from May 23 to August 23, 1898. In June and July 1898 he fought in the Battle of Las Guasimas, the Battle of El Caney, at San Juan Hill, and in the Siege of Santiago de Cuba, for which he received a commendation from Major General Wheeler for "gallantry in battle". He was honorably discharged on October 3, 1898.

=== Election to Congress ===
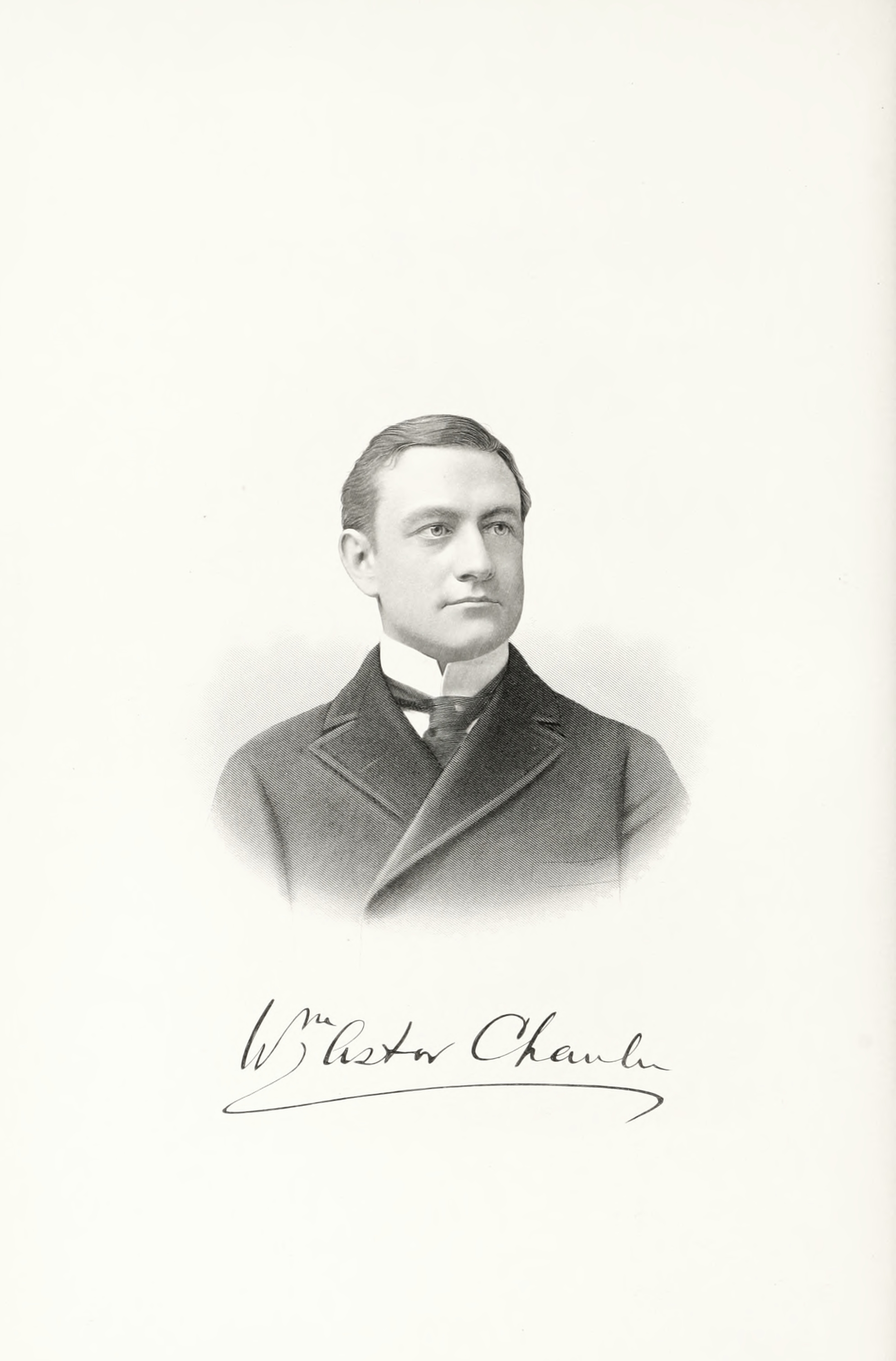
William Astor Chanler, with signature, after declaring his candidacy for Governor of New York in 1904.

On October 20, 1898, Chanler declared his candidacy for congress as a Democrat and in November he was elected to the Fifty-sixth Congress, defeating incumbent Lemuel Ely Quigg and serving as representative of New York's 14th congressional district from March 4, 1899, to March 3, 1901. During his term he introduced H.R. 9963, legislation to improve living conditions for American sailors. He expressed vocal support for the construction of the Panama Canal and the annexation of Hawaii as well as Cuba. He was not a candidate for renomination in 1900. In 1904 he declared his candidacy for Governor of New York on the combined Democratic and Independence League ticket but later withdrew. He managed the successful campaign of his brother Lewis Stuyvesant Chanler for Lieutenant Governor of New York in 1906 as well as his unsuccessful bid for governor in 1908.

== Later life ==
=== Racehorses ===
An owner of thoroughbred racehorses, Chanler raced both in the United States and in France. His trainers included Albert Cooper, U.S. Racing Hall of Fame inductee Preston M. Burch, and Chanler's friend, George Galvin. In 1896 he purchased the well-known broodmares Mannie Gray (dam of Domino) and Bandala (winner of the 1886 Mermaid Stakes). Other horses that Chanler owned included Hancock II, Aurelian, Winona, Caldron, Tender, Cresson, Madelaine, Salvacea, Camilla, Nanon, Lady Dainty, Nasturtium, Escuriel, Salvatella, I Told You, Novena and Salama.

In 1907 he purchased Olympian, a chestnut colt by Domino, out of Belle of Maywood by Lexington. Chanler took him to race in France where he disappeared during World War I. Following the war, Chanler moved his stable to the south of France and raced frequently in England and in Paris at the Saint-Cloud Racecourse, the Maisons-Laffitte Racecourse, Longchamp Racecourse and Tremblay Park. Among his most successful horses were Mandar (ridden by Matthew MacGee) and Seguridad, who won the Omnium Handicap in September 1932.

=== Business dealings and investments ===
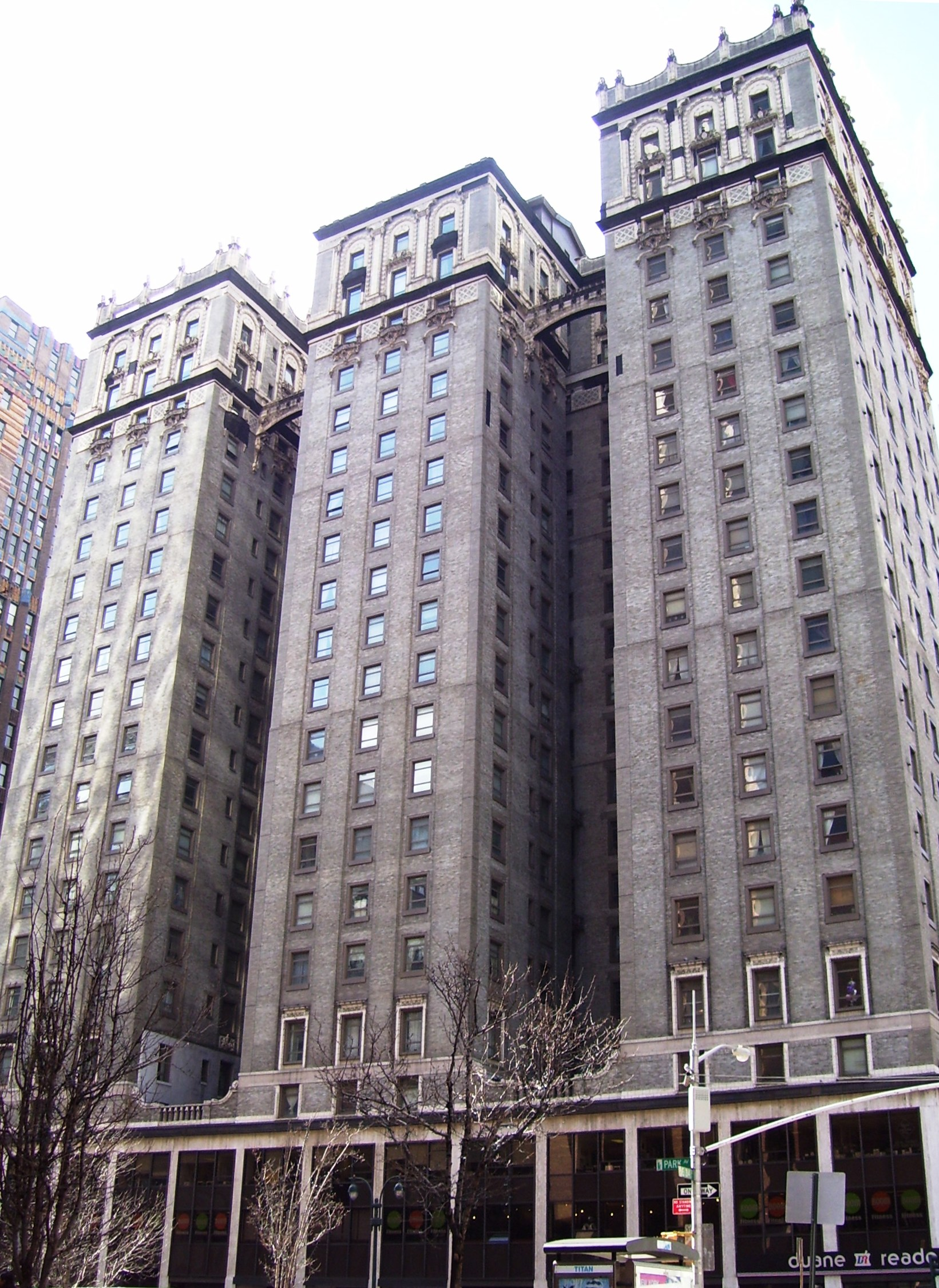
Chanler was a principal investor and co-owner of the Vanderbilt Hotel.

In 1902, Chanler purchased an iron mine in Pinar del Río Province and profits were initially robust enough that Chanler was able to loan $35 million to the Cuban government and purchase a house in Sands Point, New York. He also purchased the El Cobre Copper Mine near Santiago de Cuba, which had been abandoned since 1895. Chanler brought in Cornish miners to drain the flooded pit; however, they neglected to adequately secure the saturated ground and the entire El Cobre Mine collapsed, taking with it the beautiful church of Nuestra Senora de la Virgen de la Caridad.

While visiting his Cuban mines Chanler was introduced to a local drink known as a "Daiquiri" which he later popularized in clubs in New York. Chanler was a member of the Knickerbocker Club, the Union Club, the Players Club, the Lambs Club, the New York Yacht Club, the Meadowbrook Polo Club, the Metropolitan Club, and The Brook Club.

In 1903, he purchased two stone quarries and an ochre mine in Southern France and became president of the French firm Carrières Réunies de la Nièvre, which quarried Malvaux and Verger stone for the American Church in Paris.

In 1913, he invested in and became co-owner, together with Alfred Gwynne Vanderbilt, of the Vanderbilt Hotel at 4 Park Avenue in New York City. After Vanderbilt died in 1915 in the sinking of the RMS Lusitania, Chanler became full owner. For several years the hotel was managed by Chanler's friend, George Galvin. Chanler's ex-wife Beatrice Ashley Chanler executed a 400-foot-long frieze for the hotel's ground floor.

Chanler's investments in real estate and foreign mining operations largely insulated him from the Wall Street Crash of 1929, although towards the end of his life he began hoarding gold coins in his Paris home as insurance against currency fluctuations.

=== Hearst lawsuit ===
In 1907, Chanler filed a lawsuit for criminal libel against newspaper owner William Randolph Hearst for printing a story in The New York American on October 21 which implied that Chanler had engaged in the sexual abuse of girls together with actor and comedian Raymond Hitchcock. On October 23, Chanler filed suit and Hearst was arrested, then released on $1000 bail. As Hitchcock's trial progressed, it was revealed that the charges of sexual abuse were fabricated as part of a blackmail scheme. Hearst printed a full retraction and an apology on December 21, saying:

We have found that the story was absolutely without the slightest foundation in fact, and The American and Mr. Hearst now frankly and unreservedly state that the publication was without any justification whatever, and desire to express to Mr. Chanler our extreme regret.

Hitchcock was acquitted by a jury on June 11, 1908.

=== Insurrection in Venezuela, 1902 ===
In 1902, Chanler was approached by a group of Dutch investors, who were afraid that the Venezuelan President Cipriano Castro was about to default on a massive loan. They asked Chanler to stage a rebellion, which he did by raising a small army of "desperadoes, soldiers of fortune, cattle rustlers, bank robbers, gamblers, Indian scouts and fugitives," recruiting some through his acquaintance Butch Cassidy and others from Quantrill's Raiders. The mercenary army landed on the Venezuelan coast, marched inland and threatened to seize power, but the insurrection was called off when the president agreed to comply with the terms of his loans. In return for his help, Chanler was able to borrow funds for a project to provide a new sewage and water supply system to the city of Tampico, Mexico. In 1921 he published a fictionalized account of the insurrection in his first novel, A Man's Game, under the pseudonym John Brent.

=== Support for foreign freedom fighters ===
==== The Sanibel ====
In 1904, Chanler purchased the yacht Sanibel on which he spent his honeymoon in the Caribbean. He is known to have invited Sun Yat-sen aboard to discuss his plans for overthrowing the Qing dynasty, as well as members of the Young Turk Movement who were organizing opposition to the Ottoman Empire.

==== Libya ====
In 1910, Chanler went to Libya to fight for the Senussi against Italy in the Italo-Turkish War. In August 1911, he wrote to von Höhnel to ask him to order 15 Mauser pistols and 5,000 rounds of ammunition through arms dealer Basil Zaharoff. He then visited Constantinople where he was granted a Turkish commission as colonel of auxiliaries and a gift of 500,000 Turkish lira. Chanler arranged for weapons and supplies to be landed at isolated spots along the Libyan coast. Returning to Libya, Chanler wandered the desert in disguise, exhorting the Tuaregs and Tebou to resist Italian rule. Eventually he was granted a rare audience with Ahmed Sharif as-Senussi who permitted him to recruit and train a unit of horsemen. On October 23, 1911, Arab cavalry commanded by Chanler ambushed and nearly destroyed the IV Battalion of the 11th Bersaglieri Regiment at Shar al-Shatt, killing over 500 Italian troops. Chanler was forced to leave the country a few days later after drinking poisoned camel's milk.

==== Somalia ====
In 1912, Chanler traveled to British Somaliland in present-day northwestern Somalia. There, he served until late 1913 as a military adviser to Mohammed Abdullah Hassan (the "Mad Mullah"), during the Somaliland Campaign, the Dervish State's struggle against the Italians, British and Ethiopians. Chanler's recommendations may have influenced Hassan's forces to fight the British Somaliland Camel Corps at Dul Madoba on August 9, 1913, and later to sack the port at Berbera.

=== Amputation ===
On December 8, 1913, Chanler was involved in a mysterious accident in France, during which he injured his right leg. Various reports suggested that Chanler had been in a car accident, or that he had been dueling with boxer Frank Moran and was shot (Chanler was backing Jack Johnson against Moran in the 1914 World Heavyweight Boxing Championship in Paris). Chanler was taken to the American Hospital of Paris where he underwent several surgeries, but the injury never healed and his right leg was amputated above the knee in late September 1915.

Chanler managed to overcome morphine addiction several years after the amputation. He tried dozens of different articulated prosthetic limbs before settling on a single unjointed pylon, "a plain pegleg, like that of [my] ancestor Peter Stuyvesant."

=== Philanthropy ===
In 1916, Chanler's step-nephew Victor Chapman, an aviator with the Escadrille Lafayette, was killed in a dogfight in France—the first American pilot killed in the war. Chanler established the French Heroes Lafayette Memorial Fund, together with Theodore Roosevelt and Myron Herrick, to build schools, hospitals and asylums. In December 1916 Chanler, Scottish industrialist John C. Moffat and other philanthropists including Theodore Roosevelt, Joseph Choate, Clarence Mackay, George von Lengerke Meyer, John Grier Hibben, and Nicholas Murray Butler purchased the Château de Chavaniac, birthplace of the Marquis de Lafayette in Auvergne, to serve as a headquarters for the fund, which was managed by Chanler's ex-wife Beatrice Ashley Chanler. The château served as a school, orphanage and preventorium for the care of pre-tubercular, frail and malnourished children, as well as a museum of the life and family of the Marquis de Lafayette.

=== Publications and antisemitic beliefs ===
He moved to Paris in 1920 and, encouraged by the success of his 1896 travelogue Through Jungle and Desert, he published his first novel, A Man's Game, under the pseudonym John Brent. The book was based on Chanler's involvement in a plot to overthrow President Cipriano Castro during the Venezuela Crisis of 1902–03.

Throughout the 1920s Chanler corresponded frequently with his old friend Ludwig von Höhnel, then living in retirement in Vienna, on the "Jewish world conspiracy" and the degree to which von Höhnel shared Chanler's antisemitic ideology, writing on March 22, 1923: "You don't seem disturbed by the fact that your town is overrun by Jews." Chanler accepted as authentic the widely recognized forgery, The Protocols of the Elders of Zion, and he employed agents to compile dossiers on Jewish public figures in the US and other countries.

In 1925 he published his second novel, The Sacrifice, under the pseudonym Robert Hart, in which Jewish conspirators were planning to take over Western culture and government. Chanler's sister in law, Margaret Terry, married to his brother Winthrop Astor Chanler, remarked in a memoir that late in life Chanler was "an ardent anti-Semite ... . [who] holds the Jews responsible for the World War" and that he "believes the Pope to be somehow run by the Jews, and many other things that cannot all be true." Chanler once wrote to Margaret:

Although [I am] as you know, a devout Christian, I have been helped a great deal by the Islamic faith, and lately I have been massaged by a Hindu Yoghi much to my benefit. I am so open-minded that I would, once at least, even listen to a ... . voodoo worshipper, a Mormon, or even a Holy Roller—but one religion I do bar, and that is the Hebrew.

In 1928 Chanler wrote to then-governor of New York, Franklin D. Roosevelt, on his preoccupation with Jewish conspiracy, and stated that he was in confidential communication with anti-Jewish Arab leaders including the Grand Mufti of Jerusalem. In 1933 he wrote to his sister Elizabeth Astor Winthrop Chanler on the "centralized Jewish control of world affairs," stating his belief that the British cabinet was under the control of the Fabian Society and Baron Israel Moses Sieff, who were enacting a secret plan to "Bolshevize" Great Britain and the United States, "which will result in the absolute loss of individual independence."

== Death ==
Chanler died on March 4, 1934, in Menton, Alpes-Maritimes, France. His remains were returned home for a lavish funeral held at St. Marks in the Bowery. He was buried in the Trinity Church Cemetery in New York City, near the graves of his father and grandfather. His widow died in 1946.

== Electoral history ==
1898 election: District 14
Party	Candidate	Votes	%
Democratic	William Astor Chanler	31,604	54.3%
Republican	Lemuel Quigg (incumbent)	25,209	43.3%
Socialist Labor	Emil Neppel	1,307	1.1%
Prohibition	Albert T. Wadhams	104	0.1%
Total votes		58,224	100%

New York State Assembly
Preceded by Richard Van Cott	New York State Assembly; New York County, 5th District; 1898	Succeeded by Nelson H. Henry
U.S. House of Representatives
Preceded by Lemuel Ely Quigg	Member of the U.S. House of Representatives from New York's 14th congressional district March 4, 1899 – March 3, 1901	Succeeded by William H. Douglas
