= Cypholoba divisa =

Scientific classification
- Domain: Eukaryota
- Kingdom: Animalia
- Phylum: Arthropoda
- Class: Insecta
- Order: Coleoptera
- Suborder: Adephaga
- Family: Carabidae
- Subfamily: Anthiinae
- Tribe: Anthiini
- Genus: Cypholoba
- Species: C. divisa

Binomial name
- Cypholoba divisa (Boheman, 1860)

Synonyms
- Cypholoba circumcincta (Chaudoir, 1861); Cypholoba amboensis (Peringuey, 1896); Cypholoba circumscripta (Rousseau, 1905); Cypholoba elegans (Benard, 1922)

Species of beetle

Cypholoba divisa is a species in the beetle family Carabidae. It is found in Angola, Zambia, Zimbabwe, Botswana, and Namibia.
