= Château de Chavaniac =

Fortified manor house in Auvergne, France

Coordinates: 45°09′26″N 3°34′45″E

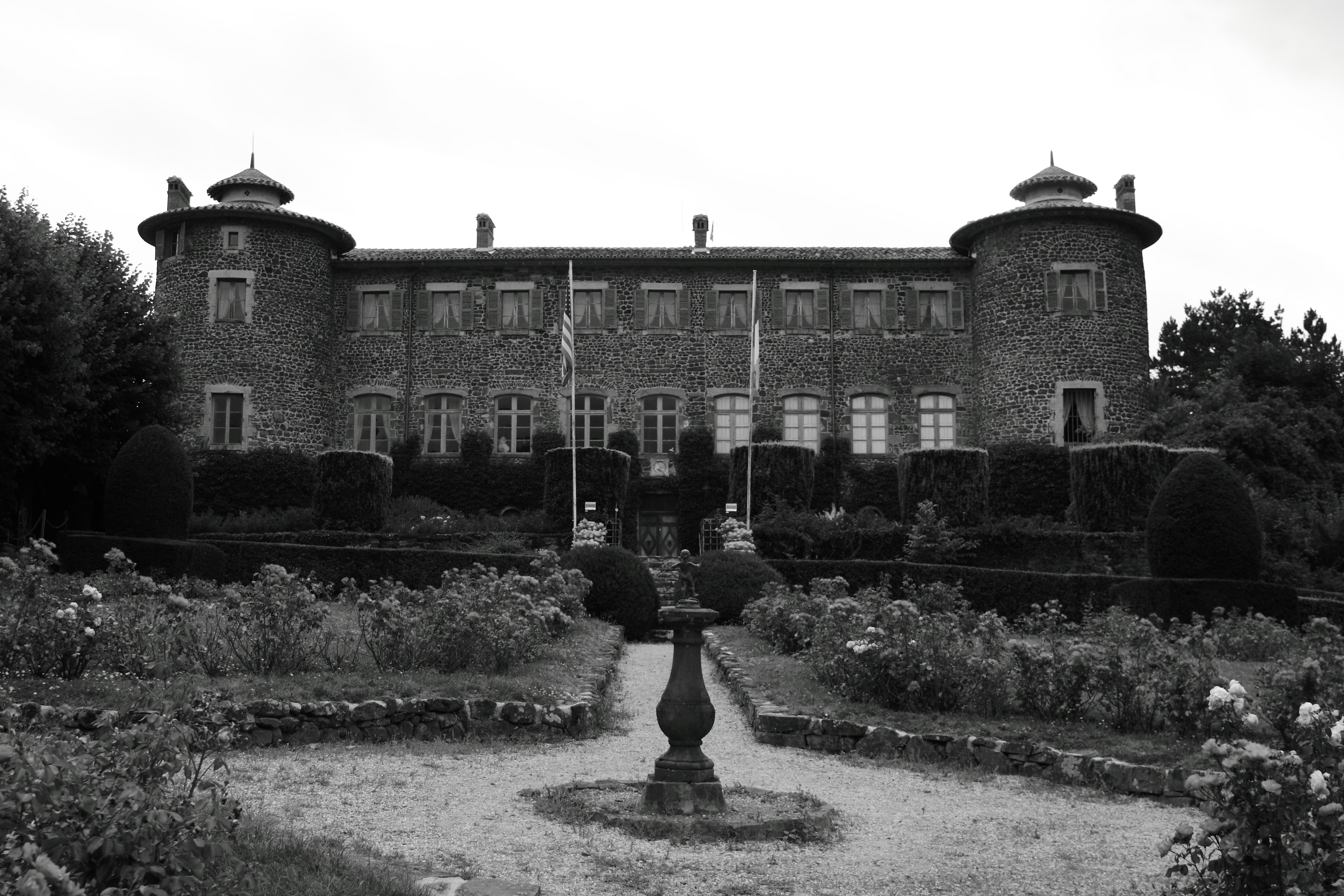
Le Château in August 2011

The Château de Chavaniac, also known as Chateau Lafayette, is a fortified manor house of eighteen rooms furnished in the Louis XIII style located in Chavaniac-Lafayette, Haute-Loire, in Auvergne province, France.

Flanked by two towers of black stone, it was built in the 14th century and was the birthplace of General Lafayette in 1757.

In 1916, a group of wealthy philanthropists led by Scottish-born American industrialist John C. Moffat purchased the castle to serve as a center of philanthropy for people affected by World War I. Following the war he renovated it completely to preserve documents and objects relating to General Lafayette.

The Château de Chavaniac is now a museum open to the public.

== History ==
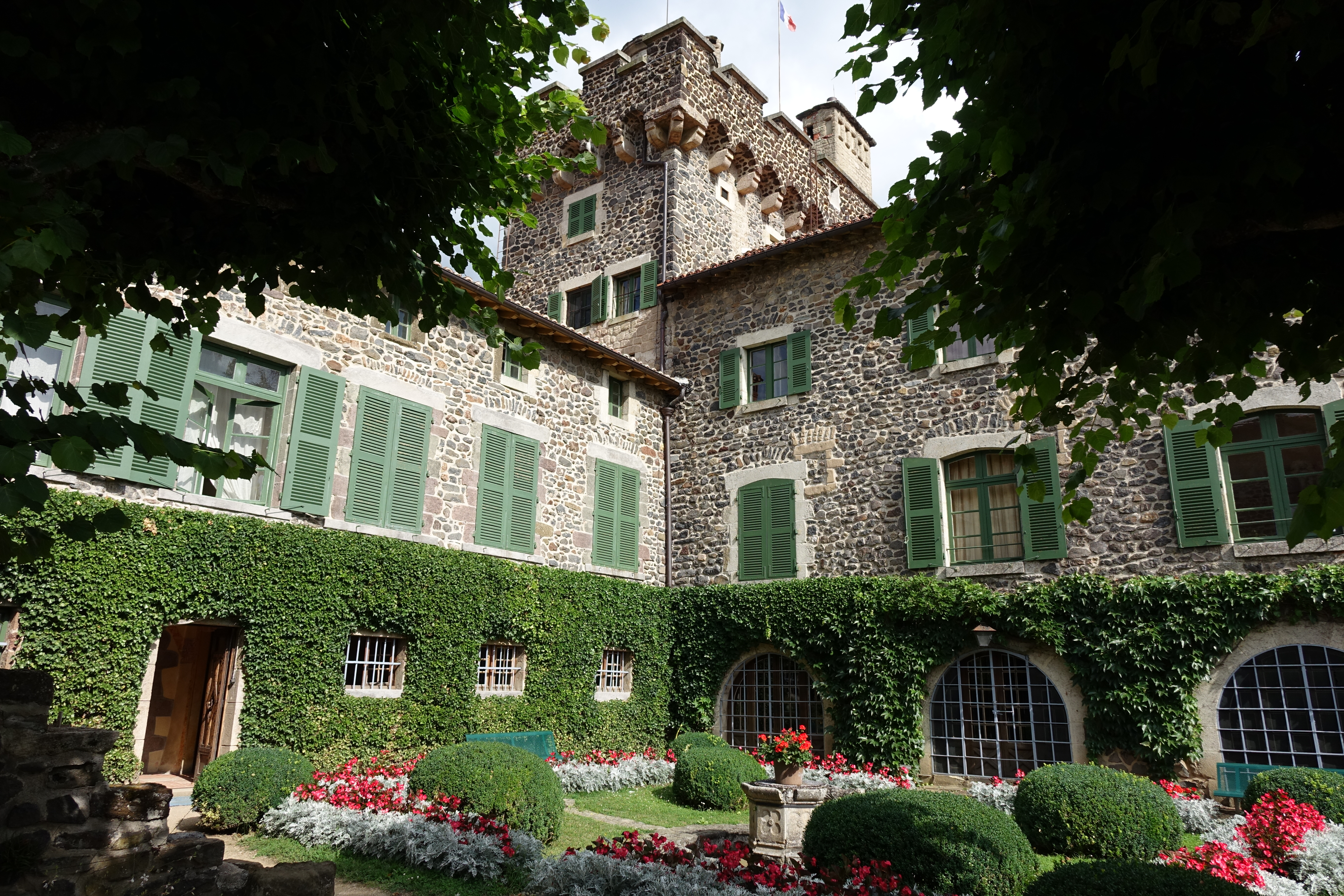
The central tower and gardens at Château de Chavaniac in July 2017

The Château de Chavaniac was constructed in the 14th century.

It was partially destroyed by a fire in 1701. General Lafayette was born here in 1757. He was married in 1774 to Adrienne de Noailles. They had four children together: Henriette, who died at a young age, Anastasie, Georges and Virginie who lived in the castle. A hero of the American and French revolutions, he was rejected by the French revolutionaries when he voted against the death of King Louis XVI. With the fall of the monarchy, he tried to flee to the United States through the Dutch Republic. He was captured by Austrians and was made prisoner by Austria at the fortress of Olmütz. He was considered a traitor for not saving the life of Marie-Antoinette, an Austrian by birth, and the king. Lafayette returned to France in 1797. The château was restored to Lafayette in 1791 but sold by the French Republic when Lafayette fled the country. His aunt later bought the château.

In December 1916, a group of philanthropists led by John C. Moffat, and including William A. Chanler, Joseph Choate, Clarence Mackay, George von Lengerke Meyer, John Grier Hibben, and Nicholas Murray Butler, purchased the château for the French Heroes Lafayette Memorial Fund which was managed by Chanler's estranged wife Beatrice Ashley Chanler.

Parts of the château were used as a school, an orphanage and a hospital, known as the Lafayette Preventorium, until 1920, supported by funds from 150,000 donors. During the post-war period, the château was extensively renovated and furnished with memorabilia from Lafayette and other period pieces. The roof was redone, foundations were stabilized, a tower was rebuilt and the south wing was built in the rear with a square tower. During World War II the château was used as a secret hiding place for Jewish children.

John Moffat died in 1966 and was buried with his wife on the grounds of château. The Lafayette Memorial Association Inc. took over management of the château. The museum was renovated in the 1990s with the sponsorship of Merck Sharp Chemical Co. In 2007 the Lafayette Preventorium became a separate institute, the Institut thérapeutique, éducatif et pédagogique. In 2009, the Conseil Général de la Haute-Loire took over management of the château and repaired the roof.

The French and American flags fly permanently over the château in honor of the key role Lafayette played in the French and American revolutions.

== Architecture ==
The Château de Chavaniac framed by two towers of black rock from Auvergne was constructed in the 14th century. The château and the interior decoration were listed as historic monuments by France on August 21, 1989.

In the entrance one finds a great staircase, a gallery with painted murals, a Louis XIII dining room, and a guardroom. The first floor has a grand salon, a library, and the family's bedrooms. The second floor has a great hall and the master bedroom with a bathroom and a sauna. The Franco-American friendship room is found on the fourth floor.

== See also ==
- List of castles in France
