= Chavaniac-Lafayette =

- Commune
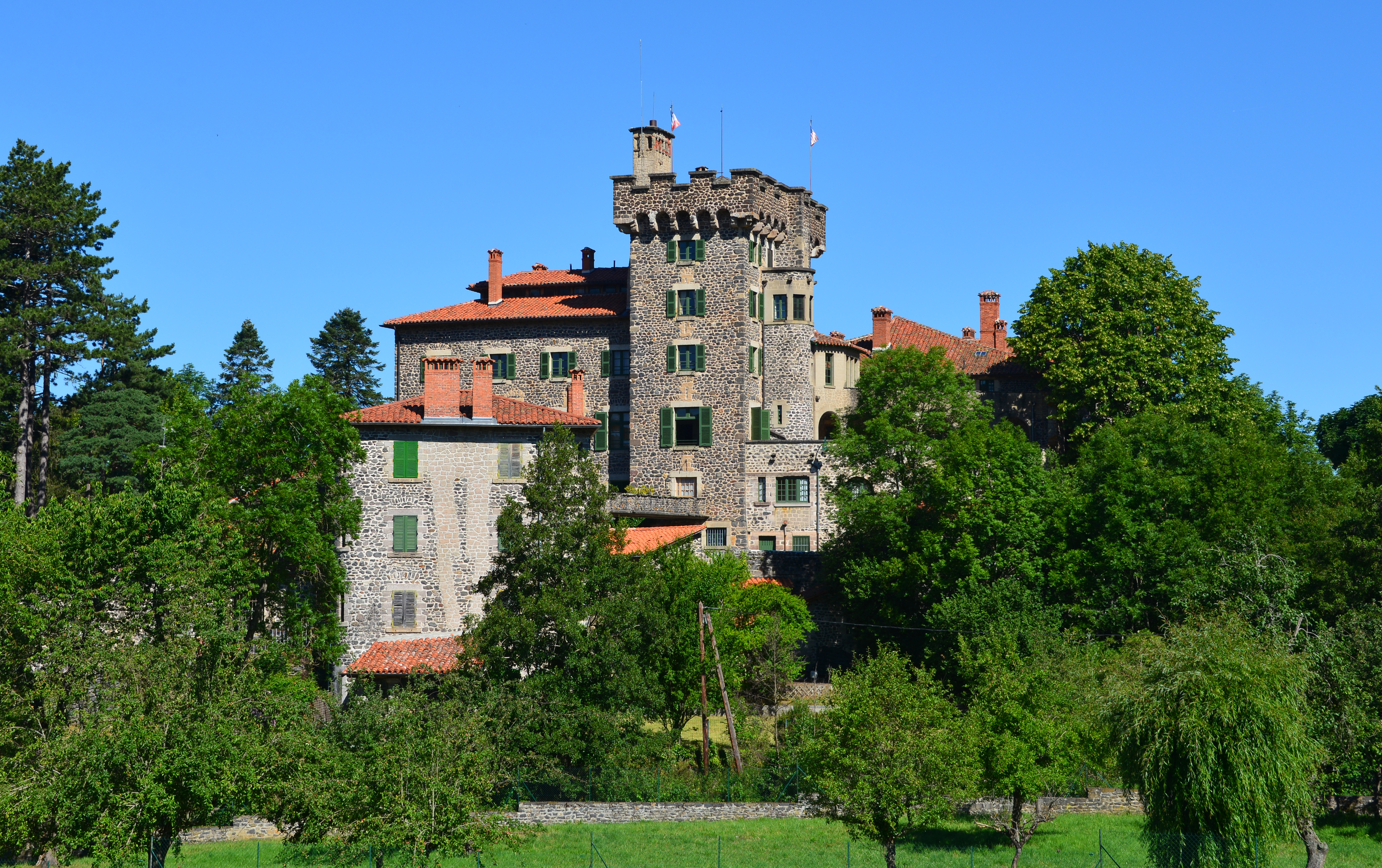
- Château de Chavaniac
- Location of Chavaniac-Lafayette
- Location within France Location within Auvergne-Rhône-Alpes
- Coordinates: 45°09′34″N 3°34′52″E
- Country: France
- Region: Auvergne-Rhône-Alpes
- Department: Haute-Loire
- Arrondissement: Brioude
- Canton: Pays de Lafayette

Government
  - Mayor (2020–2026): Maurice Lac
- Area^{1}: 8.41 km^{2} (3.25 sq mi)
- Elevation: 714 m (2,343 ft)
- Highest elevation: 1,046 m (3,432 ft)
- Lowest elevation: 620 m (2,030 ft)
- Population (2023): 273
  - Density: 32.5/km^{2} (84.1/sq mi)
- Time zone: UTC+01:00 (CET)
  - Summer (DST): UTC+02:00 (CEST)
- INSEE/Postal code: 43067 /43230
- ^{1} French Land Register data, which excludes lakes, ponds, glaciers > 1 km^{2} (0.386 sq mi or 247 acres) and river estuaries.

Chavaniac-Lafayette (French pronunciation: [ʃavanjak lafajɛt]; Occitan: Chavanhac de La Faieta) is a commune in the Haute-Loire department in south-central France.

The Château de Chavaniac, located in the commune, was the birthplace of Gilbert du Motier, Marquis de Lafayette in 1757. Originally named Chavaniac, the commune was renamed Chavaniac-Lafayette in 1884 in honor of its most famous resident.

== Population ==
Historical population
Year	Pop.	±% p.a.
1968	458	—
1975	389	−2.31%
1982	352	−1.42%
1990	317	−1.30%
1999	293	−0.87%
2007	291	−0.09%
2012	275	−1.12%
2017	275	+0.00%
2023	273	−0.12%
Source: INSEE

== Gallery ==
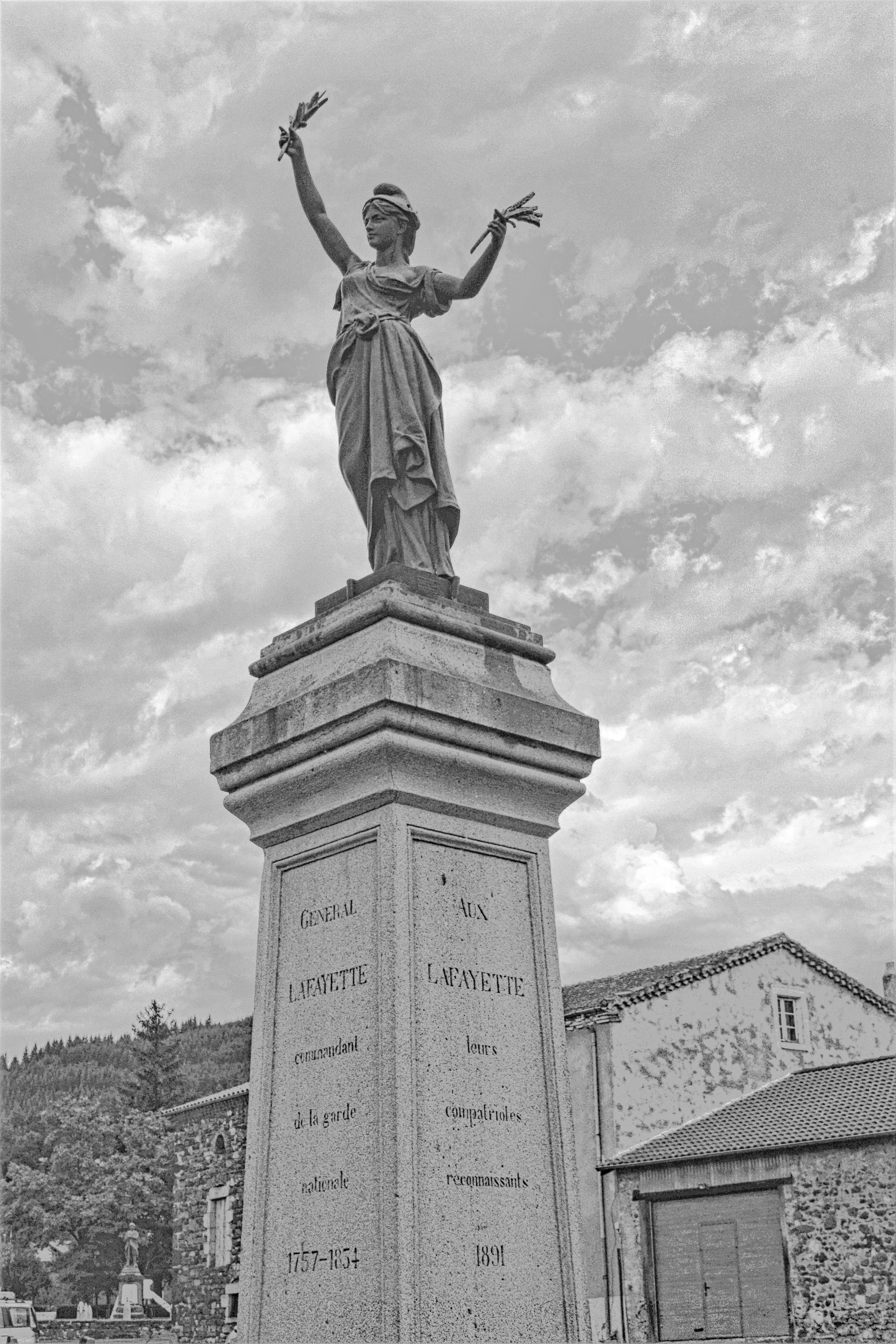

== See also ==
- Communes of the Haute-Loire department
- The Bastard (novel)
