= Lemuel E. Quigg =

American politician (1863–1919)

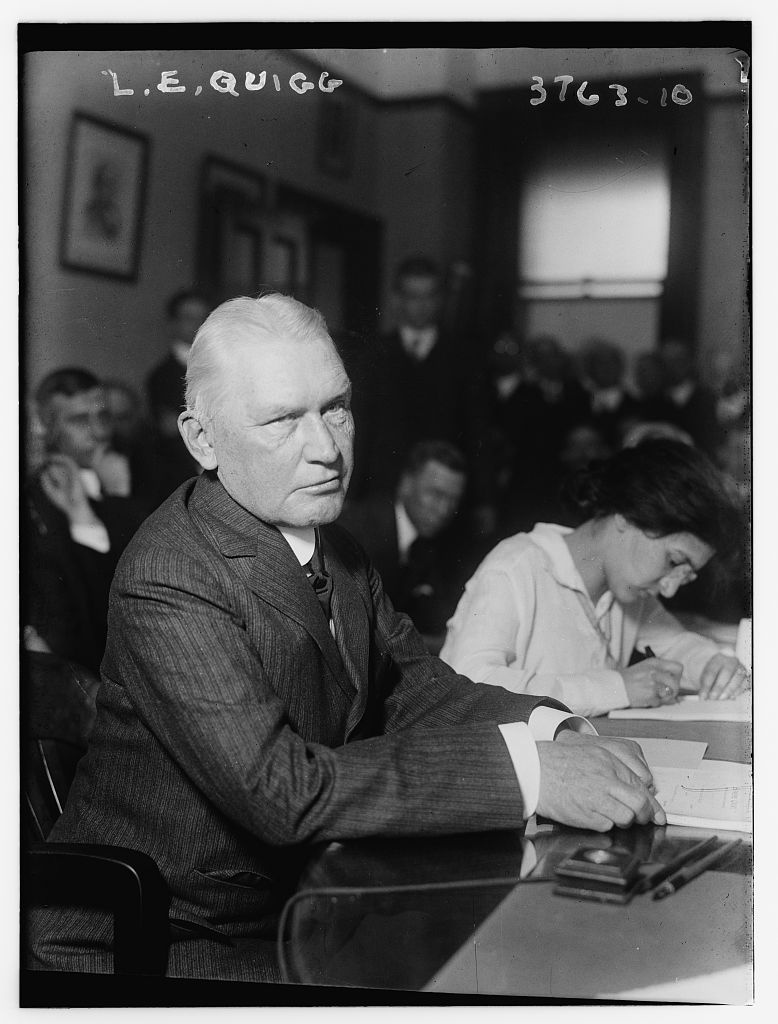
Testifying before the Thompson Committee circa February 10, 1916

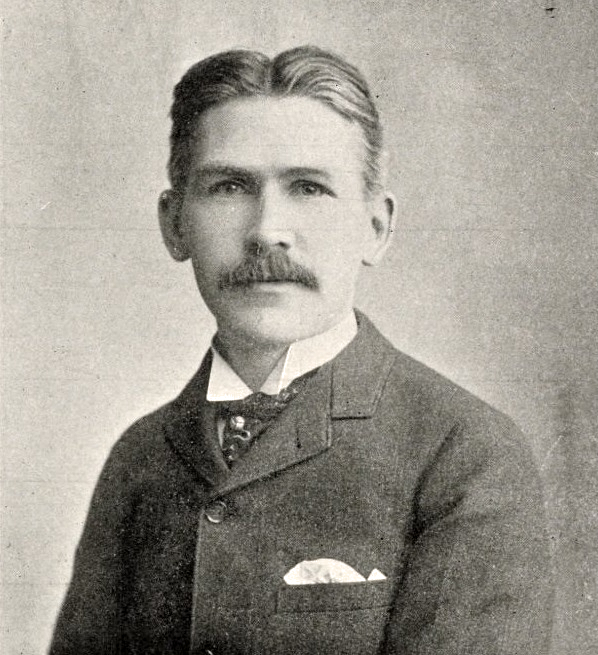
Lemuel E. Quigg, New York Congressman

Lemuel Ely Quigg (February 12, 1863 – July 1, 1919) was a United States representative from New York.

== Biography ==
He was born near Chestertown, Kent County, Maryland to a Methodist minister. He attended the public schools of Wilmington, Delaware. He moved to New York City in 1880 and engaged in journalism. He was the editor of the Flushing (N.Y.) Times in 1883 and 1884. He was a member of the editorial staff of the New York Tribune from 1884 to 1894. He served as the editor-in-chief of the New York Press in 1895.

Quigg was elected as a Republican to the Fifty-third Congress to fill the vacancy caused by the resignation of John R. Fellows. He was re-elected to the Fifty-fourth and Fifty-fifth Congresses and served from January 30, 1894, to March 3, 1899. He served as chairman of the Committee on Expenditures in the Department of State (Fifty-fourth and Fifty-fifth Congresses). He was an unsuccessful candidate for re-election in 1898 to the Fifty-sixth Congress, losing to New York millionaire William A. Chanler.

He was chairman of the Republican State conventions in 1896 and 1902 and a delegate to the Republican National Convention in 1896, 1900, and 1904. He was the president of the Queens Republican county committee 1896–1900. He was a delegate to the State constitutional convention in 1915.

After leaving Congress, he studied law and was admitted to the bar in 1903. He engaged in the practice of law in New York City until his death there in 1919 after a three-month bout with Bright's disease. Survived by his wife Ethel G. (Murray), son Murray Townsend Quigg, brothers Rev. Howard and A.W., and two sisters, he was buried in Flushing Cemetery, Flushing, Queens County, New York.

U.S. House of Representatives
Preceded by John R. Fellows	Member of the U.S. House of Representatives from New York's 14th congressional district January 30, 1894 – March 3, 1899	Succeeded by William A. Chanler
