= Beatrice Chanler =

American actress

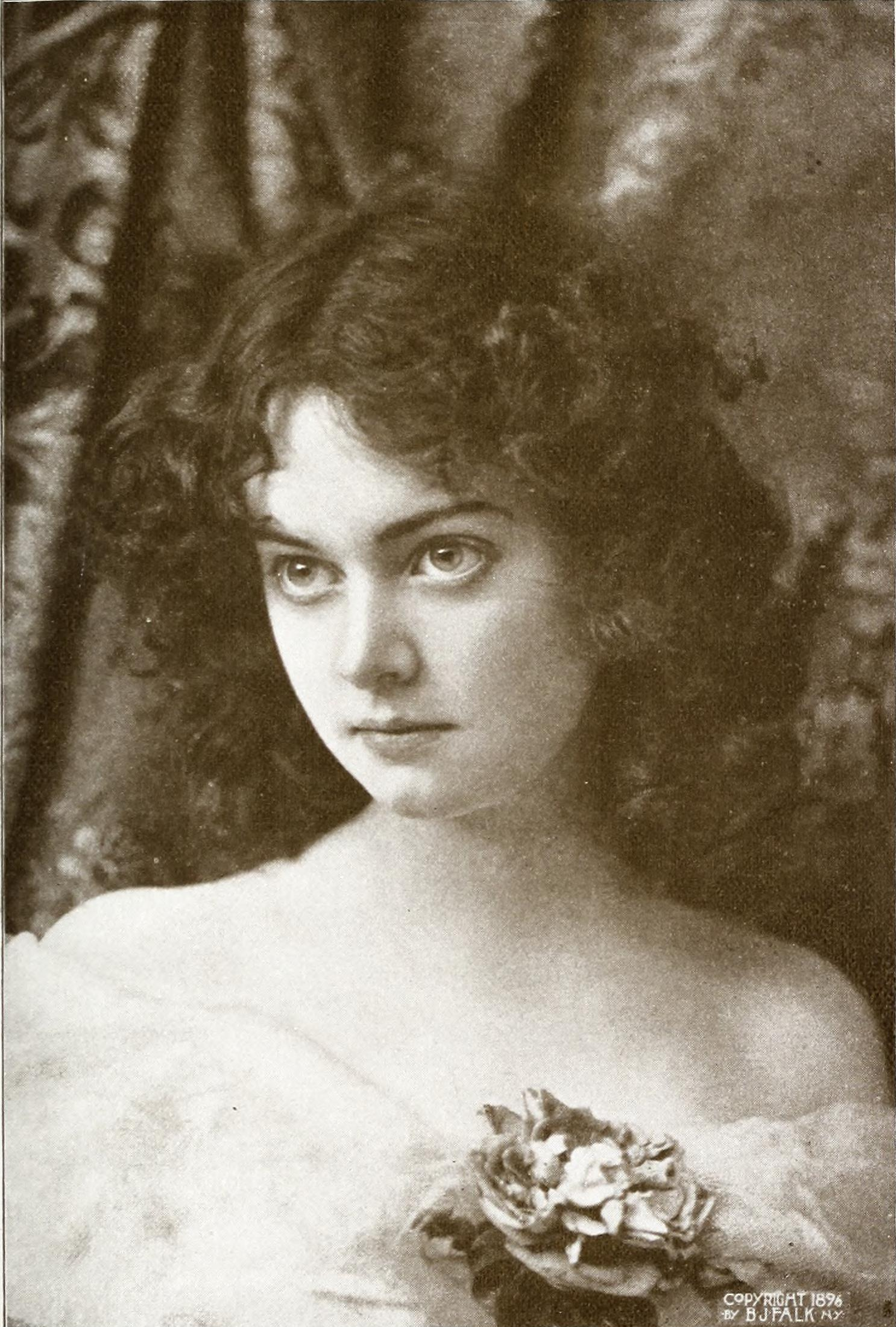
- Minnie Ashley in 1896
- Born: Minnie W. Collins; May 7, 1880; Dartmouth, Massachusetts, U.S.
- Died: June 19, 1946 (aged 66); New York City, U.S.
- Occupations: Actress; sculptor; philanthropist
- Spouses: William Sheldon (m. 1897, divorced) William Astor Chanler (m. 1903; sep. 1909)
- Children: 2
- Awards: Legion of Honour; Order of the Phoenix

Beatrice Minerva Ashley Chanler (born Minnie W. Collins; May 7, 1880 – June 19, 1946), also known as Minnie Ashley, was an American stage actress, artist, and author. She was active in charity and philanthropy during World War I and World War II.

== Early life and stage career ==
Beatrice Chanler was born Minnie W. Collins on May 7, 1881 to Eliza Collins and an unknown father, according to the novelist Stephanie Dray. "At first, I believed that I was going to be telling a story about a blue-blooded do-gooder born in Charlottesville, Virginia. Instead, I found the story of an illegitimate daughter of Irish immigrants who lived a difficult childhood in Boston. And suddenly, the story became much more meaningful," Dray told the New York Post. The Post says that Ashley was born as "Minnie Collins" in Boston to an Irish-American widow named Eliza Collins. When Minnie was a toddler, her mother moved in with George Ashley, and she took his surname. The birth record of Minnie W. Collins on May 7, 1880, to Eliza Collins in Dartmouth, Massachusetts is consistent with this story. George Ashley died shortly after Minnie's 8th birthday, on May 11, 1888, in Boston.

Ashley likely adopted the middle name of Minerva for George Ashley's aunt, Minerva Crapo Lindley, who died around the time that George Ashley and Eliza Collins began living together.

She appeared in Broadway and London stage productions as Minnie Ashley from 1893 until 1902. She launched her acting career in 1893 (at the age of 12) as a member of the chorus in 1492 Up to Date by R. A. Barnet, produced on Broadway by Edward E. Rice. She then served as understudy for Edna Wallace Hopper in John Philip Sousa's operetta El Capitan (1896) starring DeWolf Hopper. The following summer she married William Sheldon, an actor, and was separated from him within a few months.

Her future husband, William A. Chanler, first saw her in a 1902 production of A Country Girl starring C. Hayden Coffin at Augustin Daly's theater in London. By then, Ashley was already well known after appearing in The Geisha (1896), The Circus Girl (1897), A Greek Slave (1899) and San Toy (1900 and 1902). Ashley was anxious to quit her stage career due to damage to her eyesight resulting from prolonged exposure to theatrical arc lights.

In 1911, after a decade's absence from the stage, Ashley returned briefly to acting, revisiting her role as Madame Sophie in "A Country Girl."

== Marriage and children ==
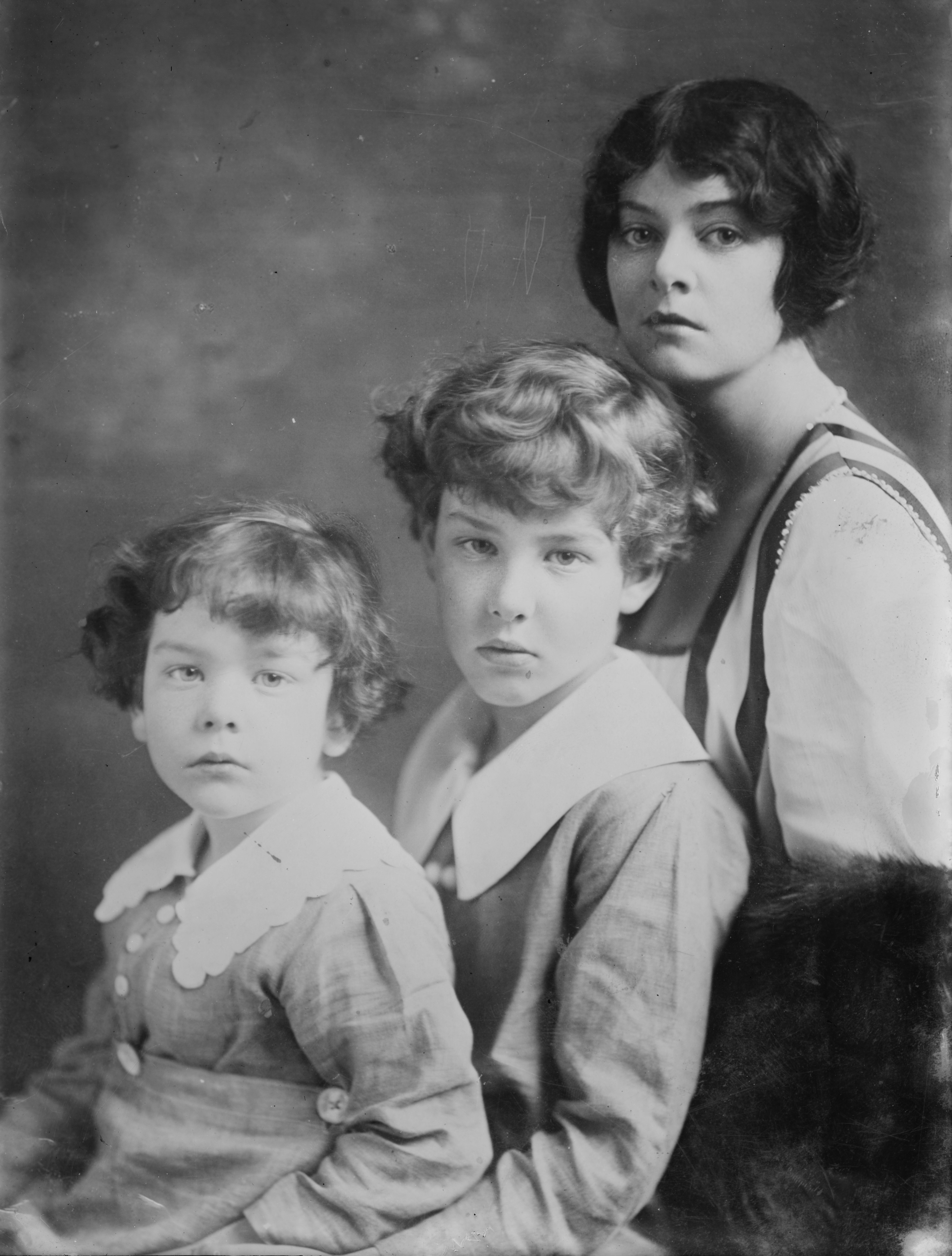
Chanler with her two sons

Minnie Ashley was courted both by William Randolph Hearst and William A. Chanler. During this courtship, in spite of the protections of secretaries at the Hearst Corporation, Chanler stormed into Hearst's office and punched him in the nose, ultimately winning the affections and hand of Miss Ashley. Ashley married Chanler on December 4, 1903 at St. George's Episcopal Church in Manhattan. The union was controversial as Chanler's family disapproved of his choice to marry an actress and because of Ashley's previous divorce. The couple spent their honeymoon in the Caribbean on board Chanler's recently-purchased yacht Sanibel.

They had two sons:

- William Astor Chanler, Jr. (1904–2002), a published historian.
- Sidney Ashley Chanler (1907–1994), a public relations executive who in 1934 married Princess Maria Antonia of Braganza (1903–1973), daughter of the Duke of Braganza and Princess Maria Theresa of Löwenstein-Wertheim-Rosenberg

In 1909 Willie expressed a desire to go to Libya to fight for the Senussi against Italy in the Italo-Turkish War. When Beatrice objected, reminding him that he had a family to support and could not risk his life so easily, Willie revised his will, signing over the better part of his estate to his wife and sons in trust. Beatrice remained dissatisfied, however, in particular because Willie's drinking had become a problem. In the fall of 1909, Willie and Beatrice separated on good terms. The separation was never legally formalized and she retained his surname for the rest of her life. Following their separation, she maintained a home in Paris on the left bank not far from his residence on the right bank, and met frequently with him until his death in 1934. She socialized with prominent members of the theatrical community in Paris, and became close friends with Arturo Toscanini and Lionel Barrymore. In 1939 she relocated to New York City.

== Artistic and philanthropic career ==
After separating from her husband, she became a sculptor, studying under George Gray Barnard. In 1912 she executed a 400-foot-long frieze for the ground floor of the Vanderbilt Hotel at 4 Park Avenue in New York City.

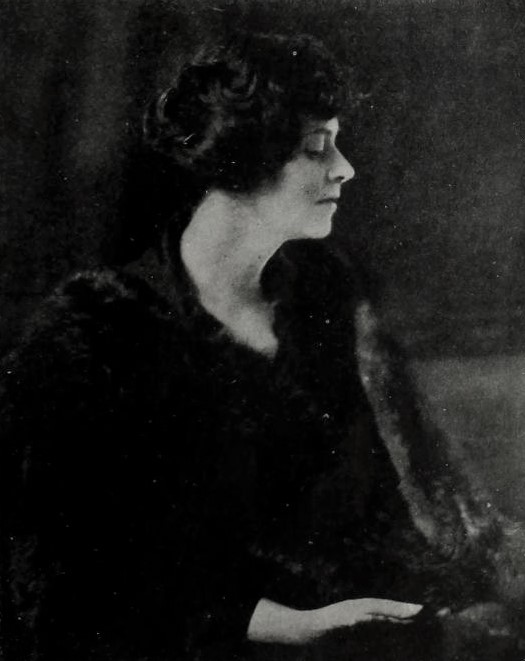
Chanler in 1921

In 1915, her husband Willie had his leg amputated in the American Hospital of Paris and Beatrice took her sons to visit him. The hospital was filled with war wounded from the Western Front, and this inspired her to become involved in philanthropy. In 1917, she volunteered to spend five months in France and told the New York Times in June:

As to the devastated regions that I visited, the awful waste and desolation is almost inconceivable. . . . I visited the ransacked regions of Pozières and Bapaume, where there was nothing but charred trees to make a village site, and a level country made undulating by shellfire. We came across a place called the Cemetery of the Tanks. Here were the battered remains of ten tanks, their hulls looking like ships wrecked at sea. Thousands of hand grenades, many of them unexploded, were lying all about us.

Later that year she co-founded and managed the French Heroes Lafayette Memorial Fund headquartered at the Château de Chavaniac in Auvergne. The château served as a school, orphanage and preventorium for the care of pre-tubercular, frail and malnourished children, as well as a museum of the life and family of the Marquis de Lafayette. During World War II the château was used as a secret hiding place for Jewish children.

Late in life she became an author, publishing a literary novel in French in 1927. She also extensively researched (on location in Paris and Algiers) a 1934 biography of Cleopatra's daughter citing English, French, German, Latin and Greek references.

During World War II she was president of two relief organizations, the Friends of Greece and the Committee of Mercy, She also served as a committee member for the National Allied Relief Committee, the League of the Allies, Relief of Belgian Prisoners in Germany, the American Fund for the Heroes of France and Her Allies, the American Branch of the French Actors' Fund, and the Russian War Relief Committee. For her philanthropic work during World War I she was decorated as a Chevalier of the Legion of Honour and for her work during World War II she was awarded (posthumously) the Greek Order of the Phoenix.

== Death ==
Beatrice Chanler died on June 19, 1946, aboard a train from New York to Portland, Maine, where she was going to open her summer home in Islesboro, Maine. Her funeral was delayed to give time for her Order of the Phoenix decoration to be flown from Athens and placed on her casket, along with her Legion of Honor cross.

== Gallery ==
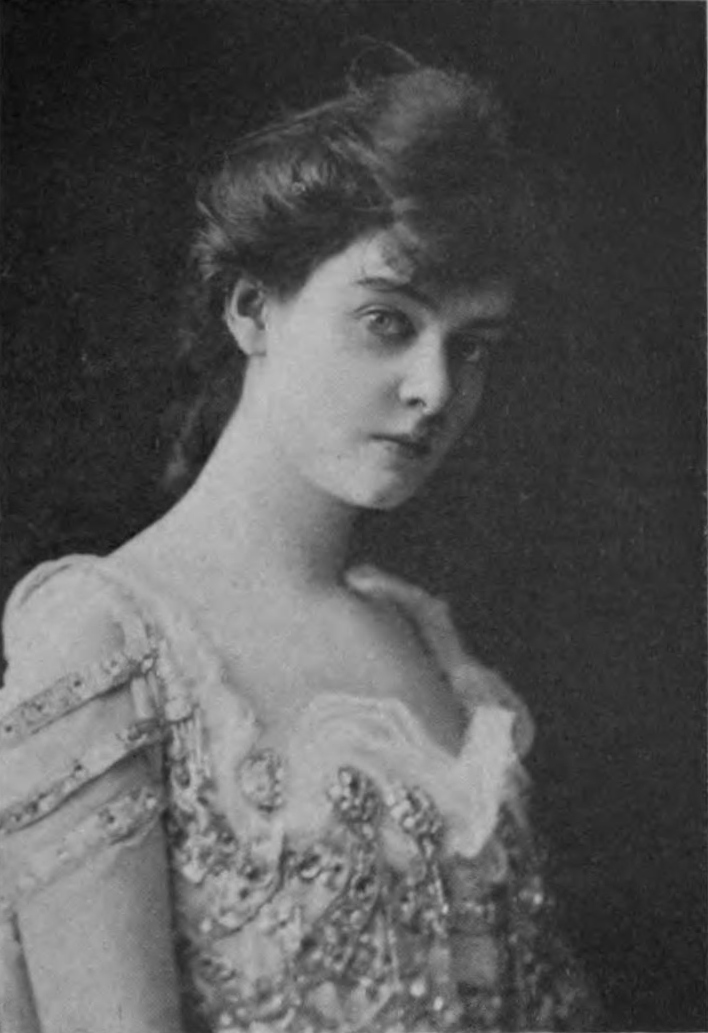
Beatrice Minerva "Minnie" Ashley, as she appeared during a production of San Toy

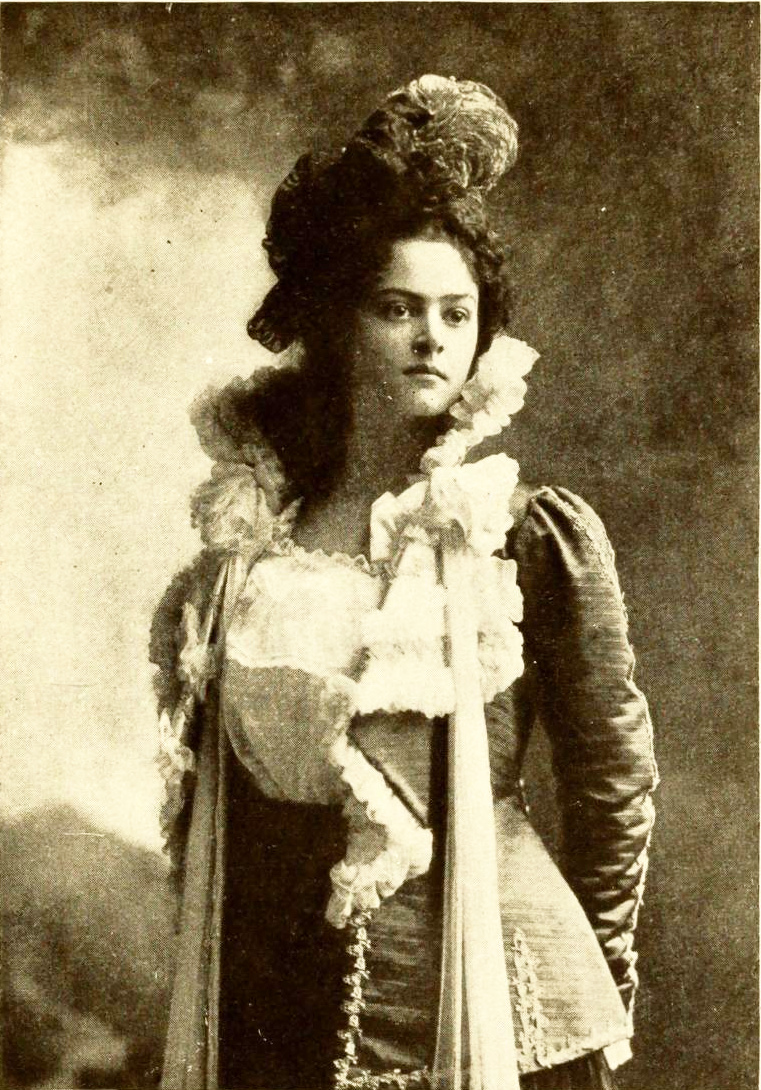
Minnie Ashley in 1900, from Famous Prima Donnas (1900) by Lewis C. Strang

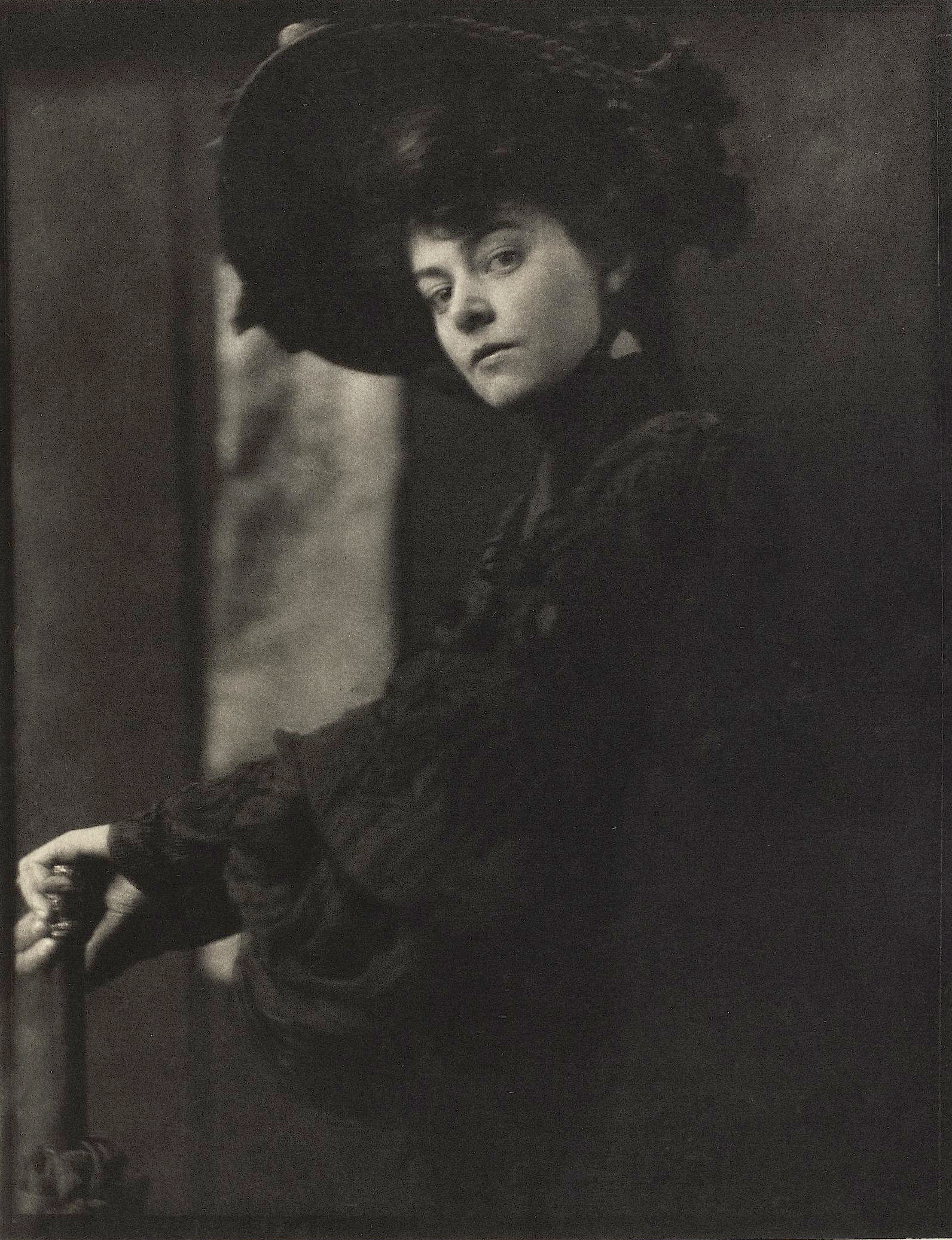
Beatrice Chanler in April 1905. Portrait by Gertrude Käsebier

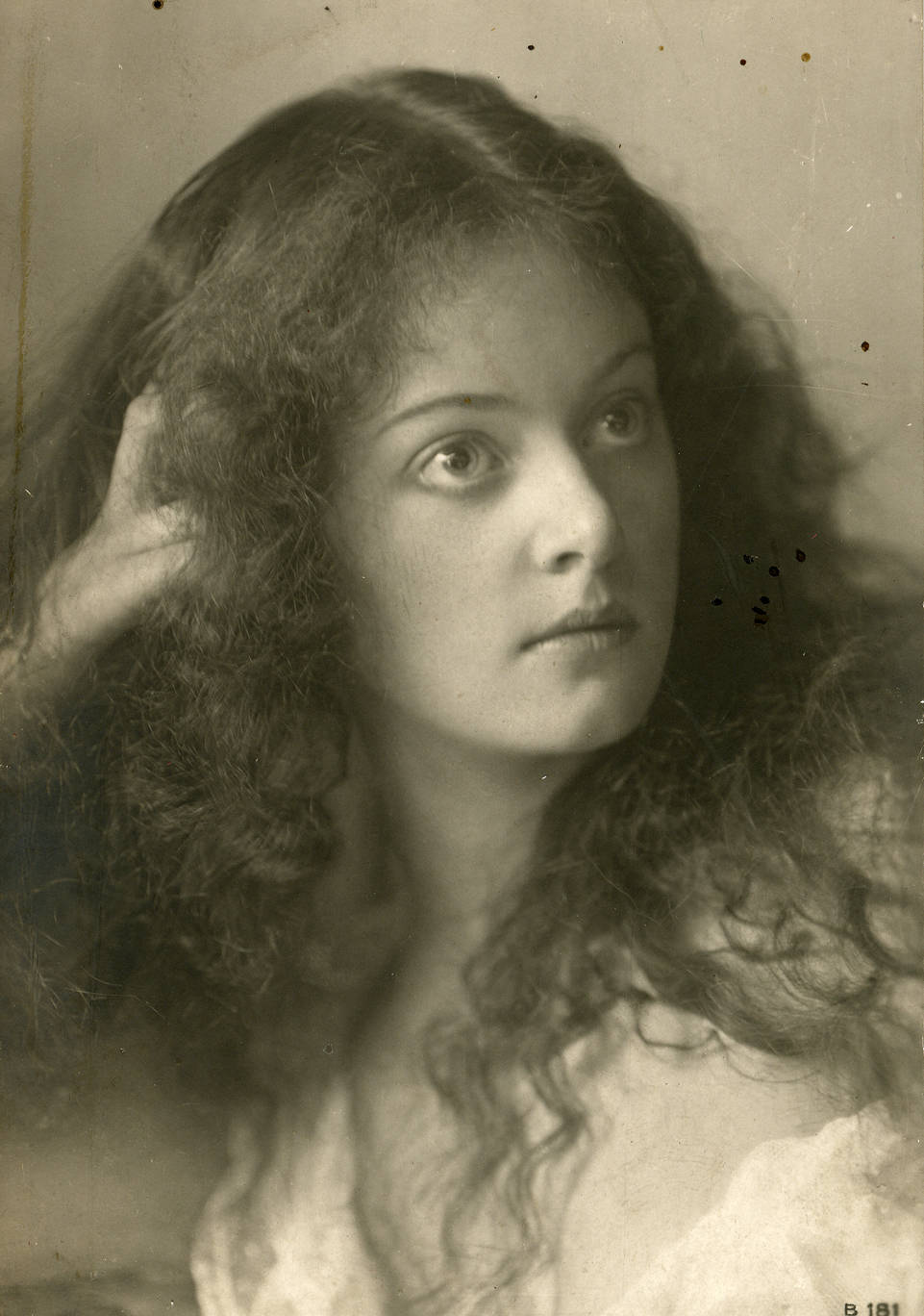
Beatrice Ashley Chanler in 1908

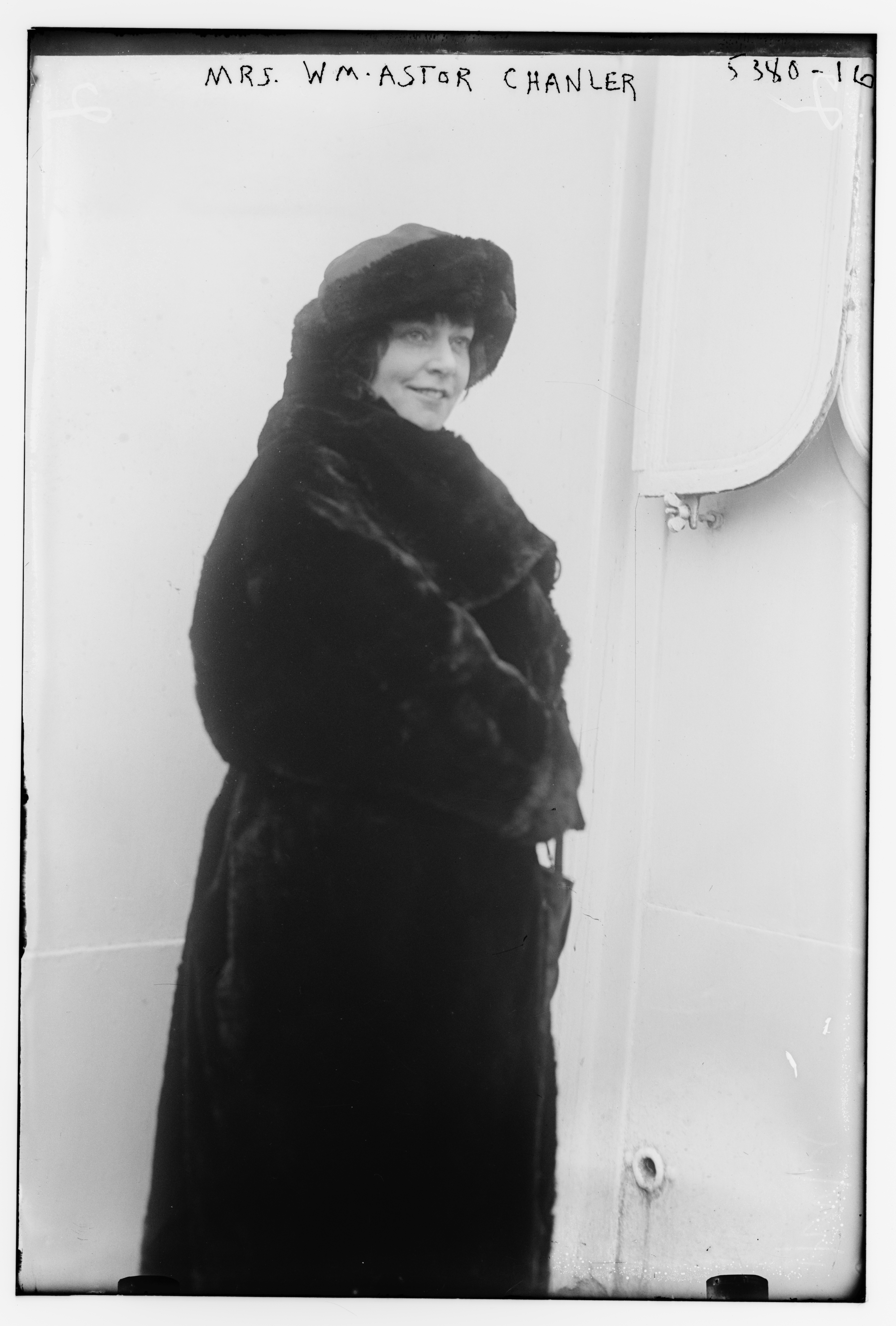
Beatrice Ashley Chanler on her way to visit France, about 1915

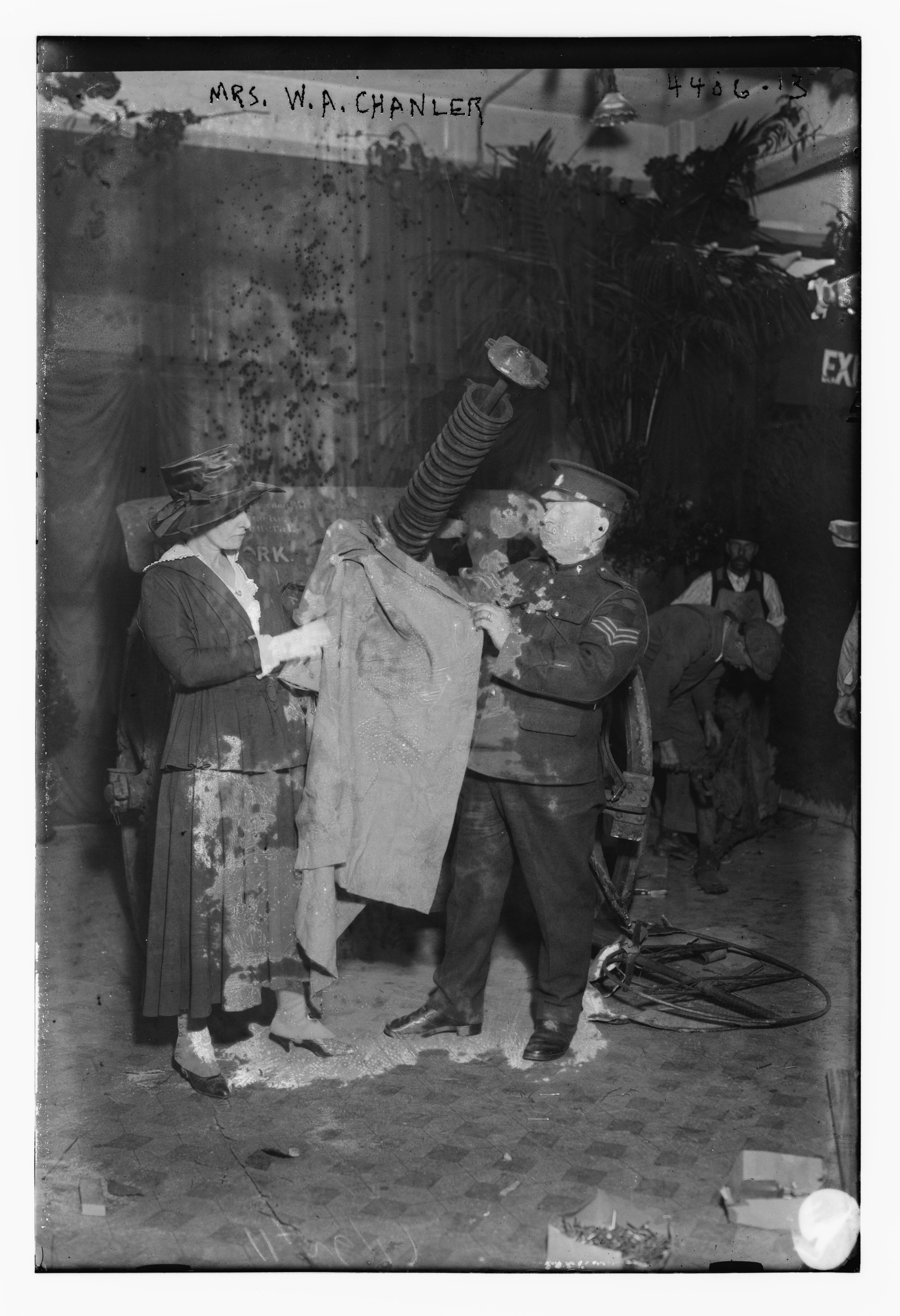
Beatrice Ashley Chanler visiting France, sometime between 1915 and 1920
