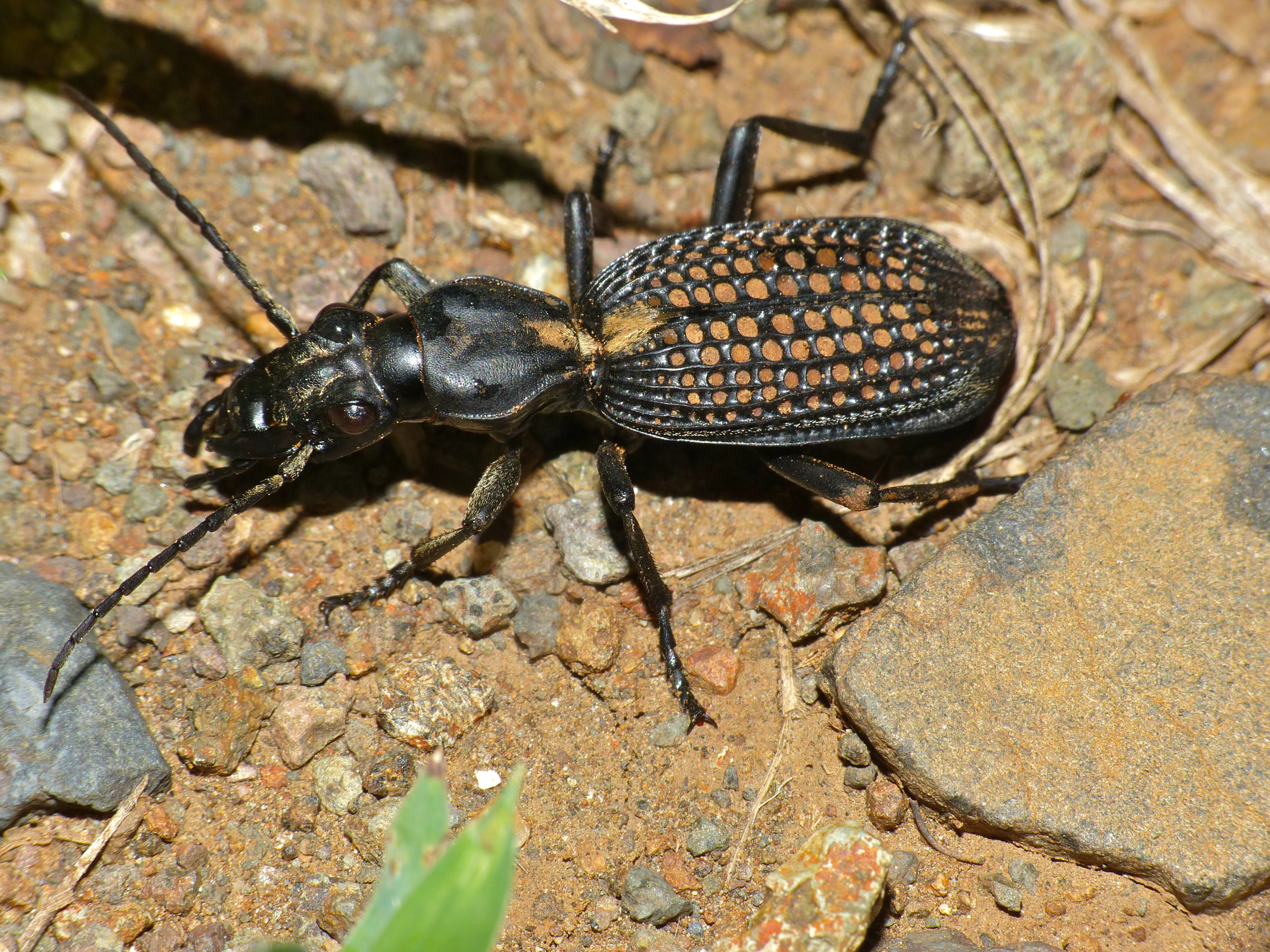
- Cypholoba alveolata

Scientific classification
- Domain: Eukaryota
- Kingdom: Animalia
- Phylum: Arthropoda
- Class: Insecta
- Order: Coleoptera
- Suborder: Adephaga
- Family: Carabidae
- Subfamily: Anthiinae
- Tribe: Anthiini
- Genus: Cypholoba; Chaudoir, 1850

= Cypholoba =

Genus of beetles

Cypholoba is a genus in the beetle family Carabidae. There are more than 60 described species in Cypholoba, found in Africa.

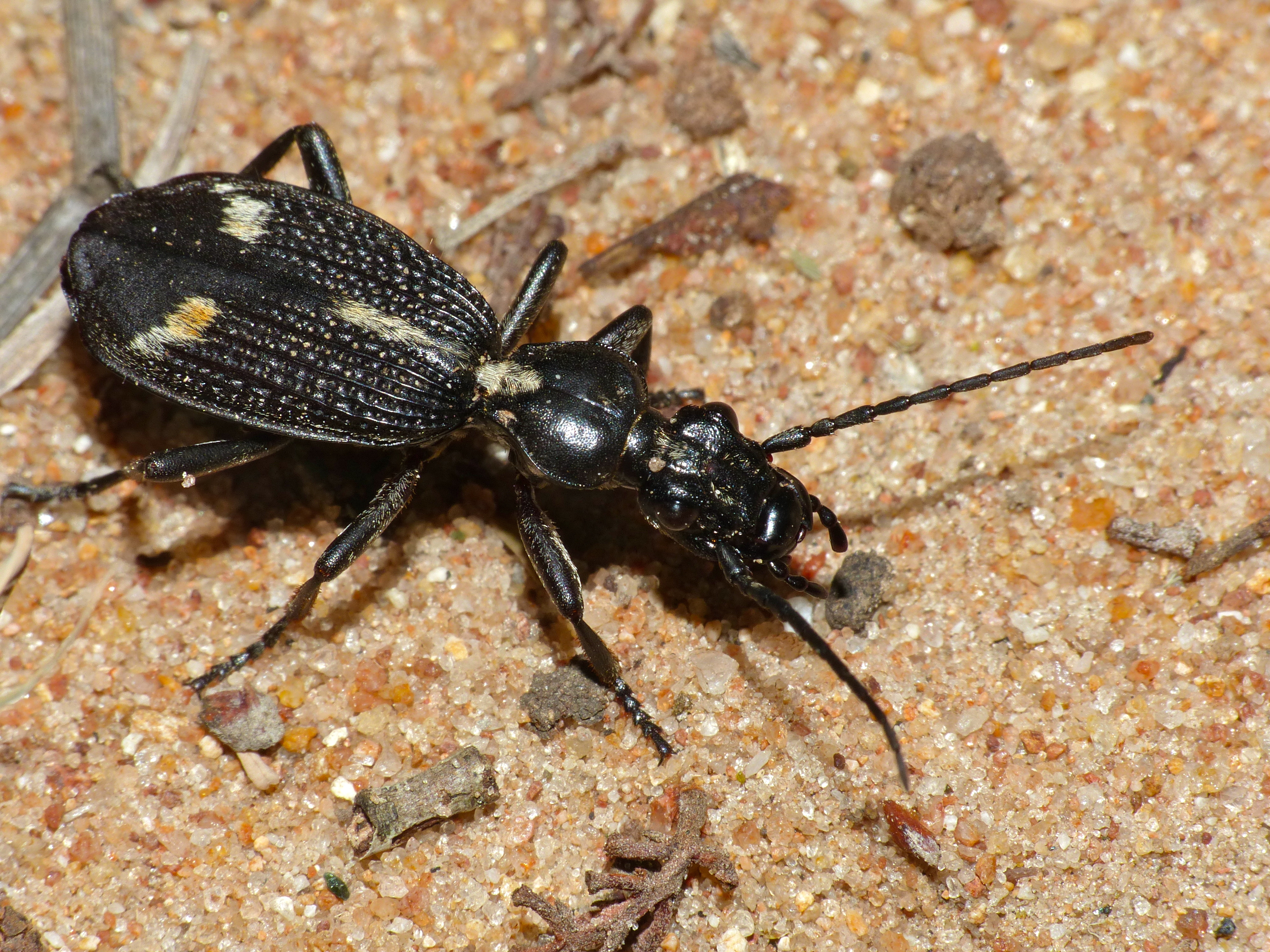
Cypholoba graphipteroides

== Species ==
These 61 species belong to the genus Cypholoba:

- Cypholoba alstoni (Péringuey, 1892)
- Cypholoba alveolata (Brême, 1844)
- Cypholoba amatonga Péringuey, 1892
- Cypholoba apicata (Fairmaire, 1885)
- Cypholoba basilewskyi Schüle & Heinz, 2013
- Cypholoba bihamata (Gerstaecker, 1867)
- Cypholoba biloba (Fairmaire, 1882)
- Cypholoba bottegoi G.Müller, 1938
- Cypholoba bouvieri (Sternberg, 1907)
- Cypholoba brevivittis (Chaudoir, 1866)
- Cypholoba cailliaudii (Laporte, 1835)
- Cypholoba cardiodera (Fairmaire, 1887)
- Cypholoba chanleri (Linell, 1896)
- Cypholoba chaudoiri (Péringuey, 1892)
- Cypholoba cinereocincta (Fairmaire, 1885)
- Cypholoba dartevellei Basilewsky, 1967
- Cypholoba divisa (Boheman, 1860)
- Cypholoba edax (Péringuey, 1892)
- Cypholoba elegantula (Fairmaire, 1887)
- Cypholoba fritschi (Chaudoir, 1883)
- Cypholoba gracilis (Dejean, 1831)
- Cypholoba graphipteroides (Guérin-Méneville, 1845)
- Cypholoba grimaudi (Bénard, 1922)
- Cypholoba griseostriata (Fairmaire, 1884)
- Cypholoba grisescens (Fairmaire, 1884)
- Cypholoba hamifera (Harold, 1881)
- Cypholoba heinzorum Schüle, 2013
- Cypholoba intermedia (Boheman, 1848)
- Cypholoba interrupta (Fairmaire, 1887)
- Cypholoba intricata (C.A.Dohrn, 1882)
- Cypholoba kassaica (Bénard, 1927)
- Cypholoba kavanaughi Basilewsky, 1983
- Cypholoba leucospilota (Bertoloni, 1849)
- Cypholoba lundana Basilewsky, 1964
- Cypholoba macilenta (Olivier, 1795)
- Cypholoba mouffletii (Chaudoir, 1866)
- Cypholoba notata (Perroud, 1847)
- Cypholoba oberthueri (Sternberg, 1907)
- Cypholoba obtusata (Fairmaire, 1887)
- Cypholoba opulenta (Boheman, 1860)
- Cypholoba overlaeti Burgeon, 1935
- Cypholoba perspicillaris (Chaudoir, 1878)
- Cypholoba piaggiae (Gestro, 1881)
- Cypholoba posticalis (Fairmaire, 1885)
- Cypholoba prolixa (Fairmaire, 1891)
- Cypholoba puchneri Schüle, 2015
- Cypholoba reflexicauda (Bénard, 1925)
- Cypholoba rohani (Bénard, 1921)
- Cypholoba rutata (Péringuey, 1892)
- Cypholoba sambesina (Péringuey, 1908)
- Cypholoba schenklingi (Sternberg, 1907)
- Cypholoba semibrunnea Strohmeyer, 1928
- Cypholoba semisuturata (Chaudoir, 1866)
- Cypholoba somereni (Bénard, 1930)
- Cypholoba spatulata (Gerstaecker, 1867)
- Cypholoba suturella (Chaudoir, 1866)
- Cypholoba tenuicollis (Chaudoir, 1878)
- Cypholoba tetrastigma (Chaudoir, 1848)
- Cypholoba trilineata Strohmeyer, 1928
- Cypholoba trilunata (Gerstaecker, 1884)
- Cypholoba zambeziana (Bénard, 1922)
