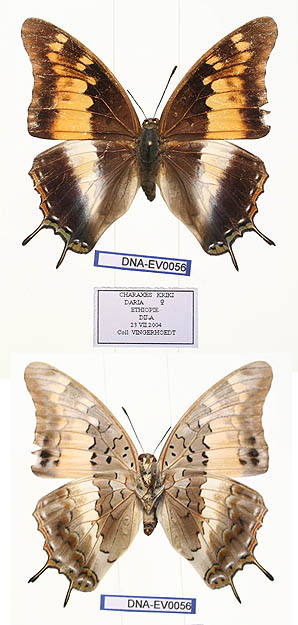
- Charaxes kirki daria

Scientific classification
- Domain: Eukaryota
- Kingdom: Animalia
- Phylum: Arthropoda
- Class: Insecta
- Order: Lepidoptera
- Family: Nymphalidae
- Genus: Charaxes
- Species: C. kirki

Binomial name
- Charaxes kirki Butler, 1881

Synonyms
- Charaxes etheocles f. rogersi Poulton, 1919; Charaxes etheocles etheocles f. albifascia Poulton, 1926; Charaxes etheocles etheocles f. handari Poulton, 1926; Charaxes etheocles suk Carpenter & Jackson, 1950; Charaxes etheocles f. kirkoides Carpenter and Jackson, 1950; Charaxes etheocles f. intermedia Carpenter and Jackson, 1950; Charaxes etheocles f. achaemenesopsis Carpenter and Jackson, 1950

= Charaxes kirki =

Species of butterfly

Charaxes kirki is a butterfly in the family Nymphalidae. It is found in Kenya, Tanzania and Uganda.

== Description ==
f. kirki Btlr. Hindwing above with broad white median band, with the proximal border bluish and the distal somewhat yellowish, marginal streaks olive, in cellules 4-6 orange. The two rows of spots on the forewing are joined together in cellules la-3 and only in cellules 4-7 more or less completely separated; the band formed by them is yellowish white to ochre-yellow. German and British East Africa.

== Biology ==
The habitat consists of savanna and dry forests.

The larvae feed on Acacia mellifera, Albizia adianthifolia, Albizia coriaria, Albizia schimperiana, Entada abyssinica, Entada leptostachys, Entada africana, Entada phaseoloides, Tamarindus indica, Acacia afra, Albizia sassa, Albizia gummifera and Entada gigas.

Notes on the biology of kirki are provided by Kielland (1990) and Larsen (1991)

== Taxonomy ==
Charaxes kirki is a member of the Charaxes etheocles species group.

== Subspecies ==
- Charaxes kirki kirki (central and eastern Kenya, central, northern and eastern Tanzania, Pemba Island)
- Charaxes kirki daria Rothschild, 1903 (Ethiopia: east of the Rift Valley)
- Charaxes kirki suk Carpenter & Jackson, 1950 (Uganda: central and north to the area west of Lake Rudolf)
