= Elizabeth Winthrop Chanler =

American heiress and socialite during the Gilded Age

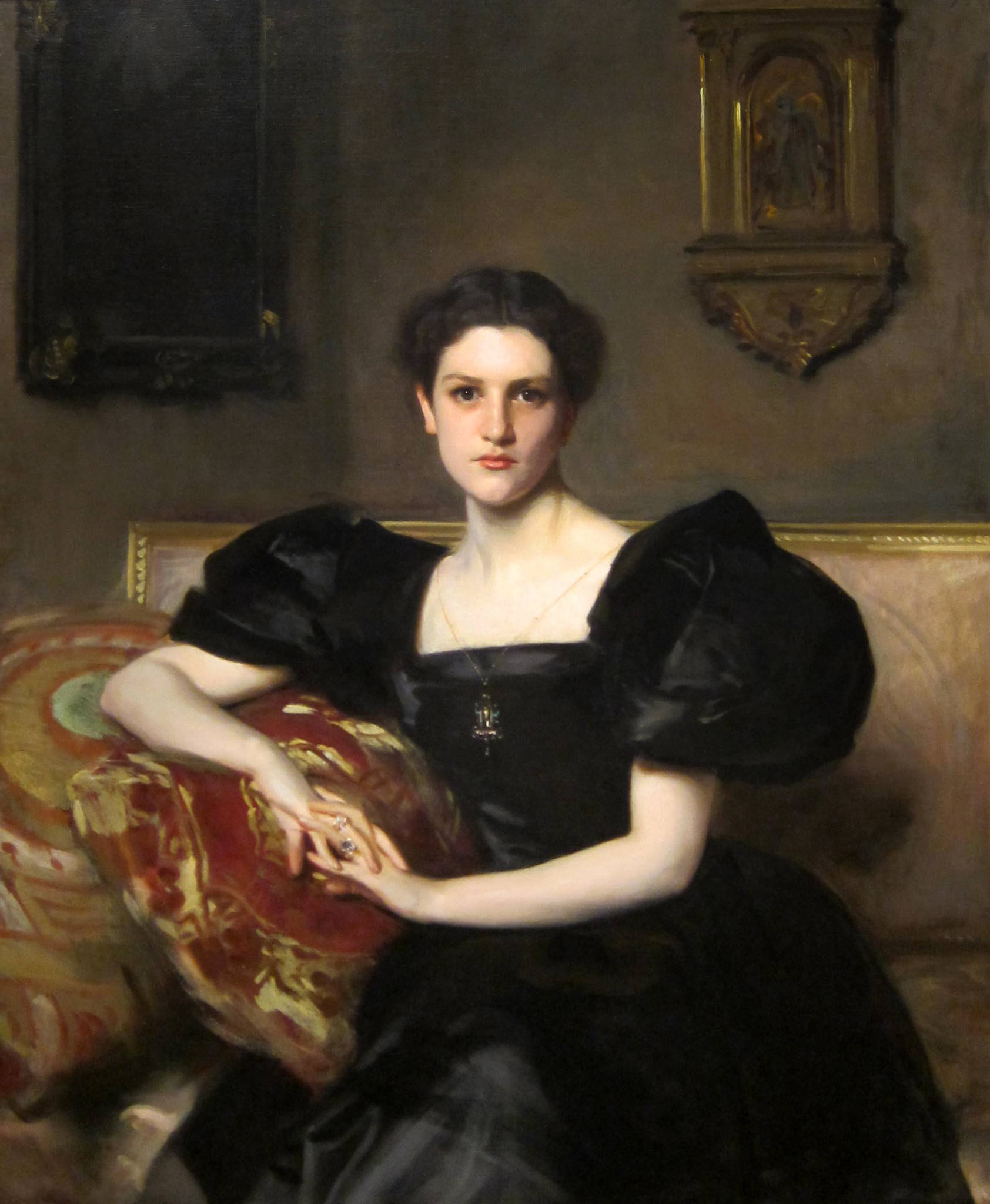
- Portrait of Chanler by John Singer Sargent, 1893
- Born: Elizabeth Astor Winthrop Chanler; February 23, 1866
- Died: June 5, 1937 (aged 71); Barrytown, New York, U.S.
- Spouse: John Jay Chapman (m. 1899; died 1933)
- Children: Chanler Armstrong Chapman
- Parent(s): John Winthrop Chanler; Margaret Astor Ward
- Relatives: Astor family

Elizabeth Astor Winthrop Chanler (February 23, 1866 – June 5, 1937), was an American heiress and socialite during the Gilded Age. She was also a member of the Astor family.

== Early life and family ==
Elizabeth Astor Winthrop Chanler was the eldest surviving daughter born to U.S. Representative John Winthrop Chanler (1826–1877) and Margaret Astor (née Ward) Chanler (1838–1875) of the wealthy Astor family. Through her father, she was a descendant of Peter Stuyvesant, the last Dutch Director-General of New Amsterdam, (Note: Elizabeth's grandfather, the Rev. Dr. John White Chanler, was married to Elizabeth Shirreff Winthrop (1789–1866), daughter of Benjamin Winthrop and Judith (née Stuyvesant) Winthrop (1765–1844). Judith's grandfather Peter Gerard Stuyvesant (1691–1777), was himself a grandson of Peter Stuyvesant.) Wait Winthrop and Joseph Dudley. Through her mother, she was a grand-niece of Julia Ward Howe, John Jacob Astor III, and William Backhouse Astor Jr. (husband of Caroline Schermerhorn Astor, who was Elizabeth's godmother). Chanler and her siblings became orphans after the death of their mother in December 1875 and their father in October 1877, both to pneumonia. The children were raised at Rokeby, their parents' 43 room estate in Barrytown.

Elizabeth, a "tough-minded woman who even in the nursery was known as 'Queen Bess' by her siblings," had nine brothers and sisters, including John Armstrong Chanler (who married novelist Amélie Louise Rives); politicians William Astor Chanler, Lewis Stuyvesant Chanler, and the artist Robert Winthrop Chanler. Her sister, Margaret Livingston Chanler, served as a nurse with the American Red Cross during the Spanish–American War (and wife of Richard Aldrich), Winthrop Astor Chanler, served in the Rough Riders in Cuba and was wounded at the Battle of Tayacoba.

== Society life ==
At her father's death in 1877, his estate was valued between $1,500,000 (equivalent to $45,351,563) and $2,000,000 (equivalent to $60,468,750 in 2025 dollars). John Winthrop Chanler's will provided $20,000 a year for each child for life, enough to live comfortably by the standards of the time.

In 1892, Elizabeth, her sisters, Margaret and Alida, and her brother Winthrop and his wife Margaret Terry Chanler, were all included in Ward McAllister's "Four Hundred", purported to be an index of New York's best families, published in The New York Times. Conveniently, 400 was the number of people that could fit into Mrs. Astor's ballroom. Elizabeth was a member of the Cosmopolitan Club of New York.

In 1893, while she was in London for a brother's wedding, John Singer Sargent, the most famous and sought after portrait artist of the day, painted a portrait of the then twenty-six year old Elizabeth. According to Sargent, she had "the face of the Madonna and the eyes of a child." Her son donated the portrait to the Smithsonian American Art Museum in 1980.

== Personal life ==
On April 23, 1899, Chanler married author John Jay Chapman (1862–1933), the son of Henry Grafton Chapman, a president of the New York Stock Exchange, and Eleanor Kingsland (née Jay) Chapman, a great-granddaughter of John Jay, the first Supreme Court Chief Justice. Chapman was previously married to Minna Timmins, who died in 1897. (Note: From his first marriage, her husband had three children: Victor Emmanuel Chapman (1890–1916), the first American aviator to die in France during World War I; John Jay Chapman Jr. (1893–1903), who died in his youth in Switzerland; and Conrad Chapman (1896–1989), who was engaged to Dorothy Daphne McBurney (1912–1997) in 1934, but who married Judith D. Kemp (1906–1999) in England in 1937.) Elizabeth and her husband had one child together:

- Chanler Armstrong Chapman (1901–1982), who married Olivia James, daughter of Edward Holton James and a grandniece of Henry James, William James, and Alice James. They divorced and he married Helen Riesenfeld, a writer, in 1948. After her death in 1970, he married Dr. Ida R. Holzbert Wagman in 1972.

John Jay Chapman died at their "Good Hap" home on November 4, 1933, near Barrytown, New York. After his death, Elizabeth spent several years working on a volume of his collected letters, and completed them just before her own death. She died on June 5, 1937, and was buried at Saint Matthew's Episcopal Churchyard in Bedford, New York.

=== Residences ===
In 1902, Elizabeth bought the former Livingston mansion, known as Edgewater, and located next to her childhood home, Rokeby, in Barrytown, New York, for $20,000 from the estate of the second owner, Robert Donaldson Jr. In 1905, she and her husband moved into a new house, known as Sylvania, that was designed by architect Charles A. Platt, and built on the hill above Edgewater. Thereafter, her mother-in-law lived at Edgewater from 1910 until at least 1914. In 1917, Elizabeth sold Edgewater to her stepson, Conrad Chapman, for $1.00. Conrad lived abroad most of his life and eventually sold the house in 1947. The house was later owned by writer Gore Vidal and financier Richard Jenrette. Shortly before her husband's death, they moved into a cottage built on the grounds of Sylvania they named "Good Hap" and turned Sylvania over to her son, Chanler Chapman.
