= Edgewater (Barrytown, New York) =

Architecturally significant house in the United States

Coordinates: 41.9973°N 73.9316°W

- U.S. National Register of Historic Places
- U.S. Historic district – Contributing property
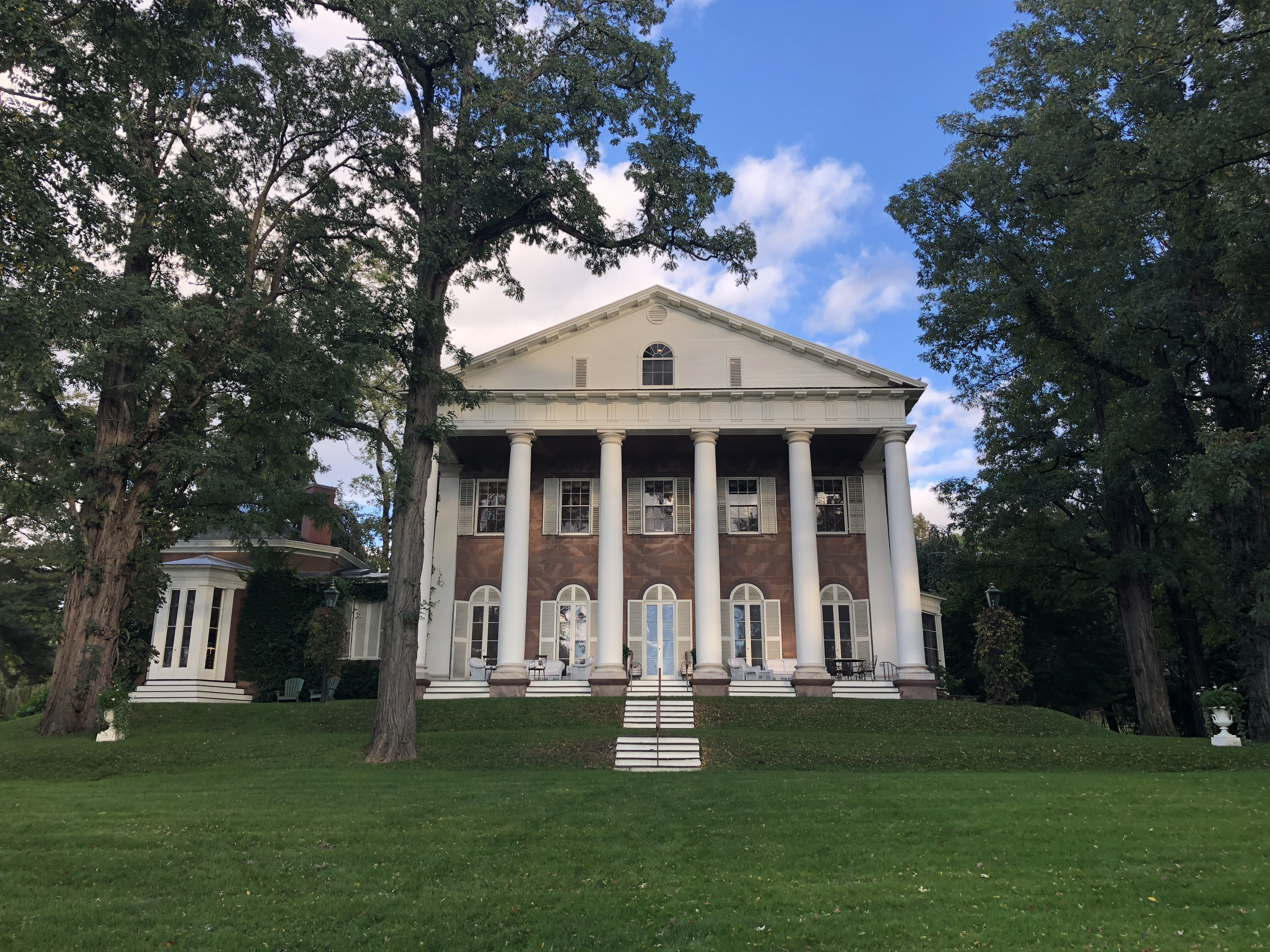
- West Facade of Edgewater in 2018.
- Location: Barrytown, New York
- Part of: Hudson River Historic District
- NRHP reference No.: 90002219

Significant dates
- Added to NRHP: December 14, 1990
- Designated CP: December 14, 1990

Edgewater is an architecturally significant, early 19th-century house located near the hamlet of Barrytown in Dutchess County, New York, United States. Built about 1824, the house is a contributing property to the Hudson River Historic District. Edgewater's principal architectural feature is a monumental colonnade of six Doric columns, looking out across a lawn to the Hudson River. Writing in 1942, the historians Harold Donaldson Eberlein and Cortlandt Van Dyke Hubbard described Edgewater as an exemplar of "the combined dignity and subtle grace that marked the houses of the Federal Era."

== History ==
=== 19th century ===
The history of Edgewater dates back to December 23, 1819, when Lowndes Brown of Charleston S.C. and Margaretta Livingston, daughter of John R. Livingston, were married by Bishop John Henry Hobart of New York City. In 1824, possibly as a belated wedding gift, John Livingston (1755–1851) gave the 250-acre Edgewater property to his daughter and son-in-law; the house may have been built around then. After her husband's in 1852, Margaretta Livingston Brown sold Edgewater to New York financier Robert Donaldson Jr. (1800–1872).

Robert Donaldson (portrayed by Charles R. Leslie) and his wife, Susan Gaston Donaldson (portrayed by George Cooke) lived at Edgewater from 1853 until her death in 1866 and his in 1872.

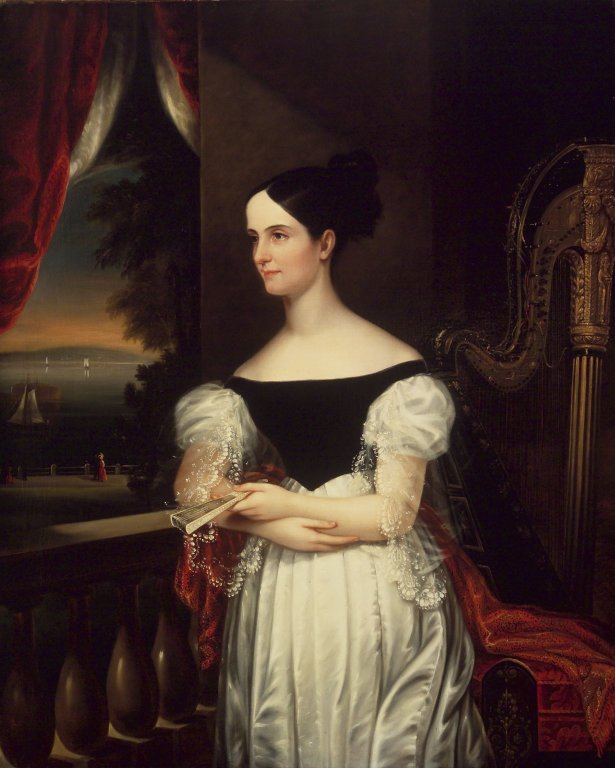

Donaldson bought Edgewater in 1853. Donaldson engaged the architect Alexander Jackson Davis (1803–1892) to add an octagonal library wing and to clad the brick house with stucco textured to resemble brownstone. Davis also designed two gatehouses.

Robert Donaldson died in 1872. In 1902 the executor of the Donaldson estate sold the house and south gatehouse to Elizabeth Chapman (1866–1937).

=== Early 20th century ===
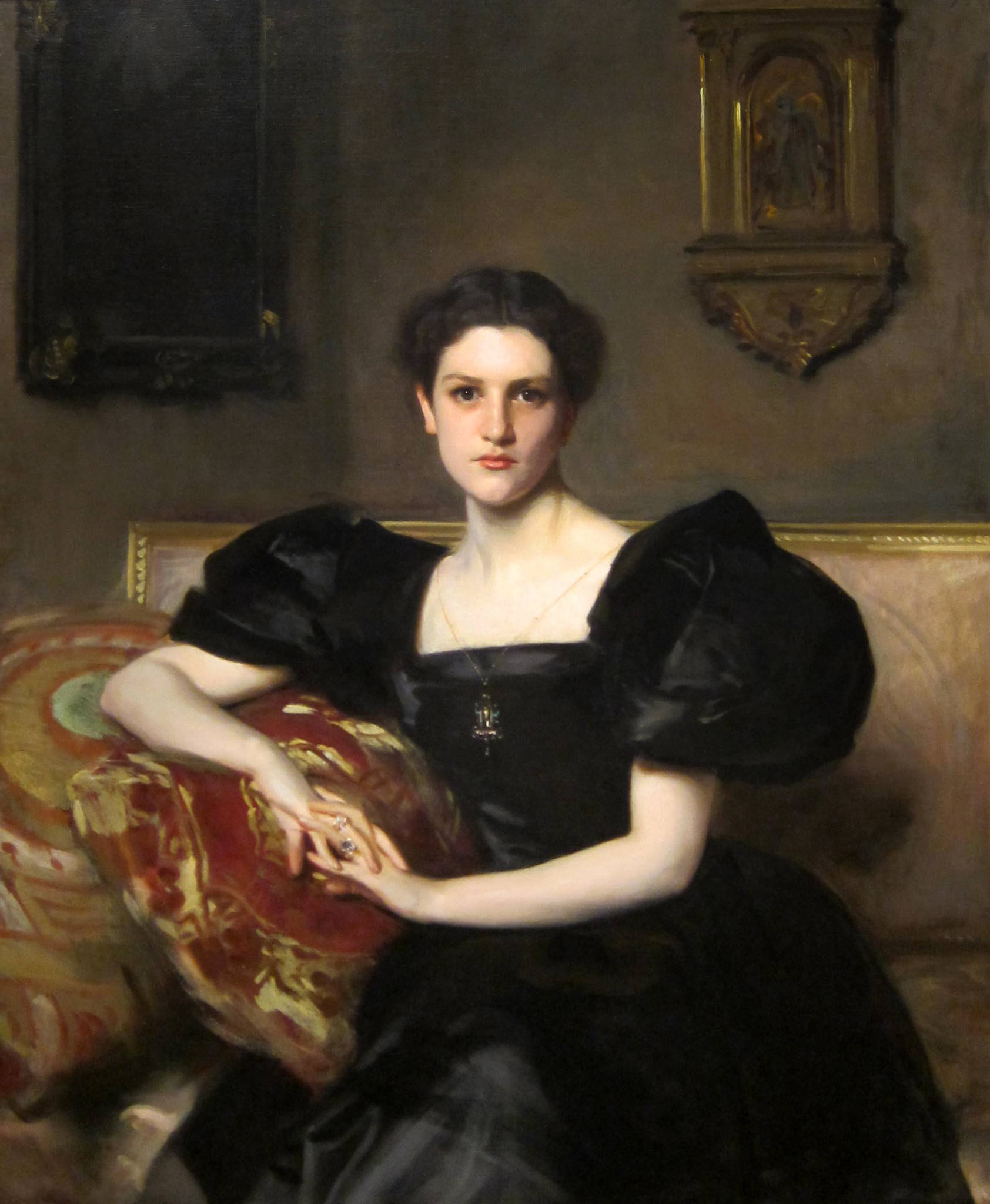
Elizabeth Chapman (portrayed by John Singer Sargent) bought Edgewater in 1902.

Chapman was the second wife of the essayist John Jay Chapman. Born Elizabeth Astor Winthrop Chanler, the daughter of John Winthrop Chanler and Margaret Astor Ward, she grew up at Rokeby, a nearby house. Although Elizabeth Chapman never occupied Edgewater, her husband used it as a retreat during the winters of 1903–04 and 1904–05. In 1905, they moved into a new house designed by the architect Charles A. Platt, built on the hill above Edgewater and known as Sylvania. They used Edgewater as a guest house for family. In July 1906, her brother, the artist Robert Winthrop Chanler, was living there when lightning struck a nearby elm tree, causing a fire within the house that was quickly extinguished. Chapman's mother-in-law, Eleanor Jay Chapman (1839–1921), a great-granddaughter of Supreme Court Chief Justice John Jay, lived at Edgewater from 1910 until at least 1914.

In 1917, Elizabeth Chapman sold Edgewater to her stepson Conrad Chapman (1896–1989). He likely spent little time there over the next twenty years; the day before the sale, Chapman left Harvard College to join the Navy, where he served until at least April 1920. According to Chapman's son, Geoffrey W. Chapman:

My father...had served in the Navy in World War I, had returned to Harvard afterwards to get his degree, and had then gone on to Oxford for a couple of years, where his roommate at Oxford was Lester Pearson, who was later Prime Minister of Canada. He went on to get a doctorate at the Sorbonne in Paris in Byzantine history, and then became a headmaster of a school in France at a school for the sons of American diplomats and businessmen living in Europe. The school folded after a couple of years so he founded another school of his own, which didn’t last very long either. He came back to this country in the late ‘30s and had a series of jobs, although no real profession, apart from that of a scholar generally, because there was a lot of family money on both sides.

In England, on August 25, 1937, Chapman married Judith Daphne Kemp (1906–1999), who according to their son:

...was English-born and had been what the English call a governess in her early adult years. She married my father after they had known each other for just a few months in 1937, and then came to this country.

The couple traveled to America on the SS Bremen, leaving Southampton and arriving in New York on October 7. By 1940, Chapman and his wife were living in Boston. According to Chapman's son, "We had a nice townhouse on Beacon Hill in Boston, smack in the middle of the city; one block below the famous Louisburg Square."

Laura M. Taylor, who initially rented the house, bought Edgewater in 1946, holding it until 1950 when she sold it to the writer Gore Vidal.

=== Late 20th century ===
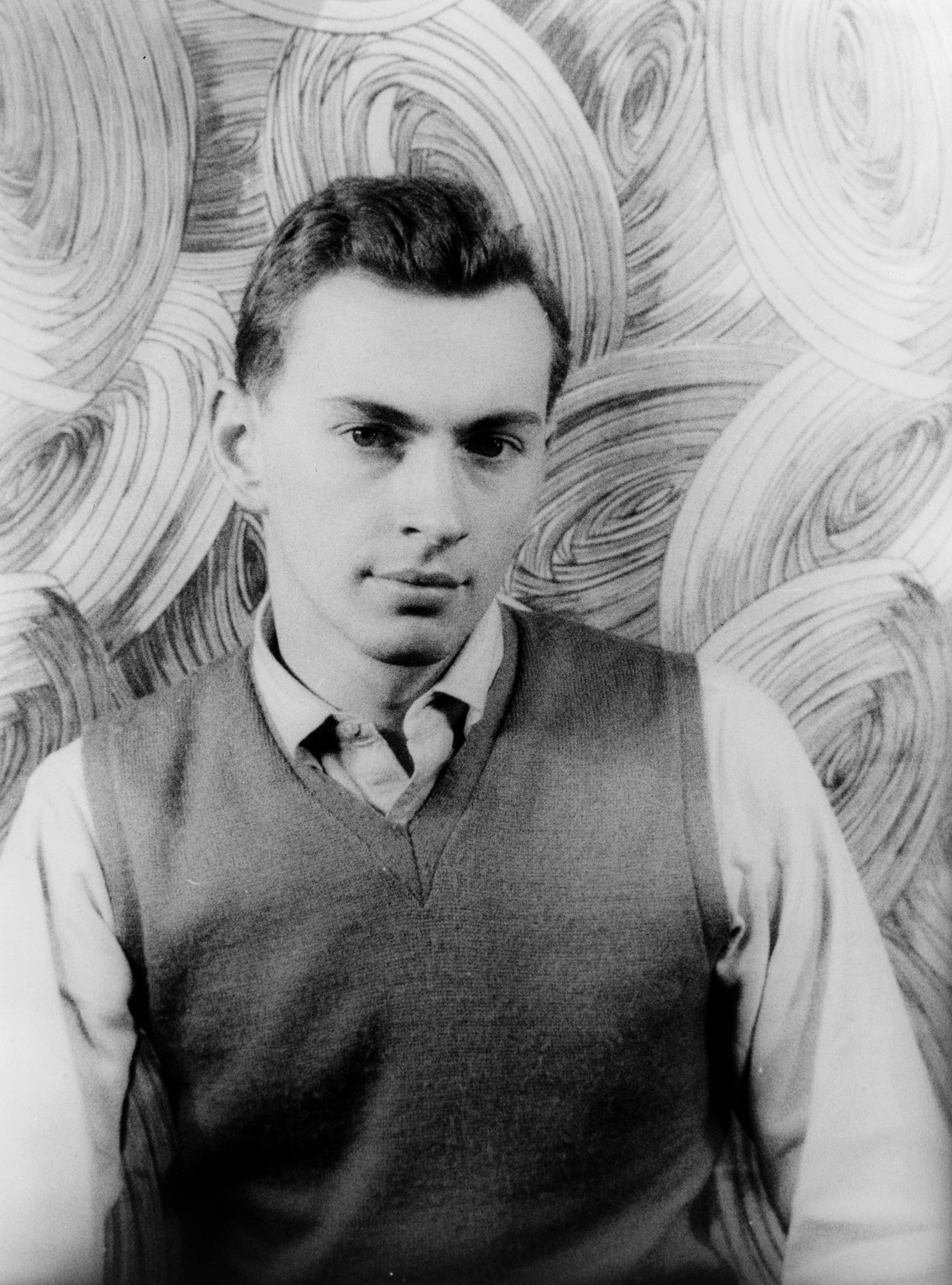
Gore Vidal (photographed by Carl Van Vechten) in 1948, two years before he bought Edgewater.

Gore Vidal (1925–2012) bought Edgewater at the recommendation of his friend, Alice Astor Bouverie. According to his memoir "Palimpsest"(1995), he paid $16,000, with a $6,000 down payment and a $10,000 mortgage. In 1960, he ran as the Democratic candidate for Congress for New York's 29th Congressional District using Edgewater as his campaign headquarters. He lost to the Republican candidate J. Ernest Wharton by a margin of 57 percent to 43 percent. Among Vidal's supporters were Eleanor Roosevelt, Paul Newman and Joanne Woodward, all of whom spoke on his behalf.

In November 1966, Vidal, then living in Italy, rented Edgewater to William vanden Heuvel (1930–2021), a lawyer, aide to Robert F. Kennedy, and husband of the writer Jean Stein (1934–2017). In 1969, Vidal sold Edgewater to New York financier Richard Jenrette for $125,000.

=== Recent history ===
When Jenrette (1929–2018) bought Edgewater in 1969, the house sat on only 2.69 acres. During his tenure, Jenrette restored the house, located and returned much of its original furniture and art, and bought back much of the acreage (though not the two gate houses). He also built two new buildings, a classical pavilion (1997) and a pool house (1997). Jenrette wrote about these additions in his memoir, Adventures with Old Houses:

In recent years, I've begun making more of my own architectural imprint on the Edgewater property. This past year I added a small neo-classical guest house, built on a point of land across the lagoon to the north of Edgewater—far enough away not to compete with the main house. Designed by Michael Dwyer of New York, the guest house is a small Grecian temple with four columns of the Doric order framing a large porch looking downriver. Viewed from the front porch of Edgewater across the lagoon, the new structure serves as an architectural folly extending the sweep of the landscape to the north.

Michael Dwyer also relocated the swimming pool and added a charming pool house, again in classical style with four Doric columns along the side of the pool. The effect is quite Roman—rather like a small corner of Hadrian's Villa. From guest house to pool house and back to the main house provides a scenic one-mile roundabout walk, mostly along the winding riverbank.

Jenrette died in 2018. The Classical American Homes Preservation Trust, which Jenrette established in 1993, now owns the house.

== Maps ==
Map Excerpt, showing Edgewater in 1850.

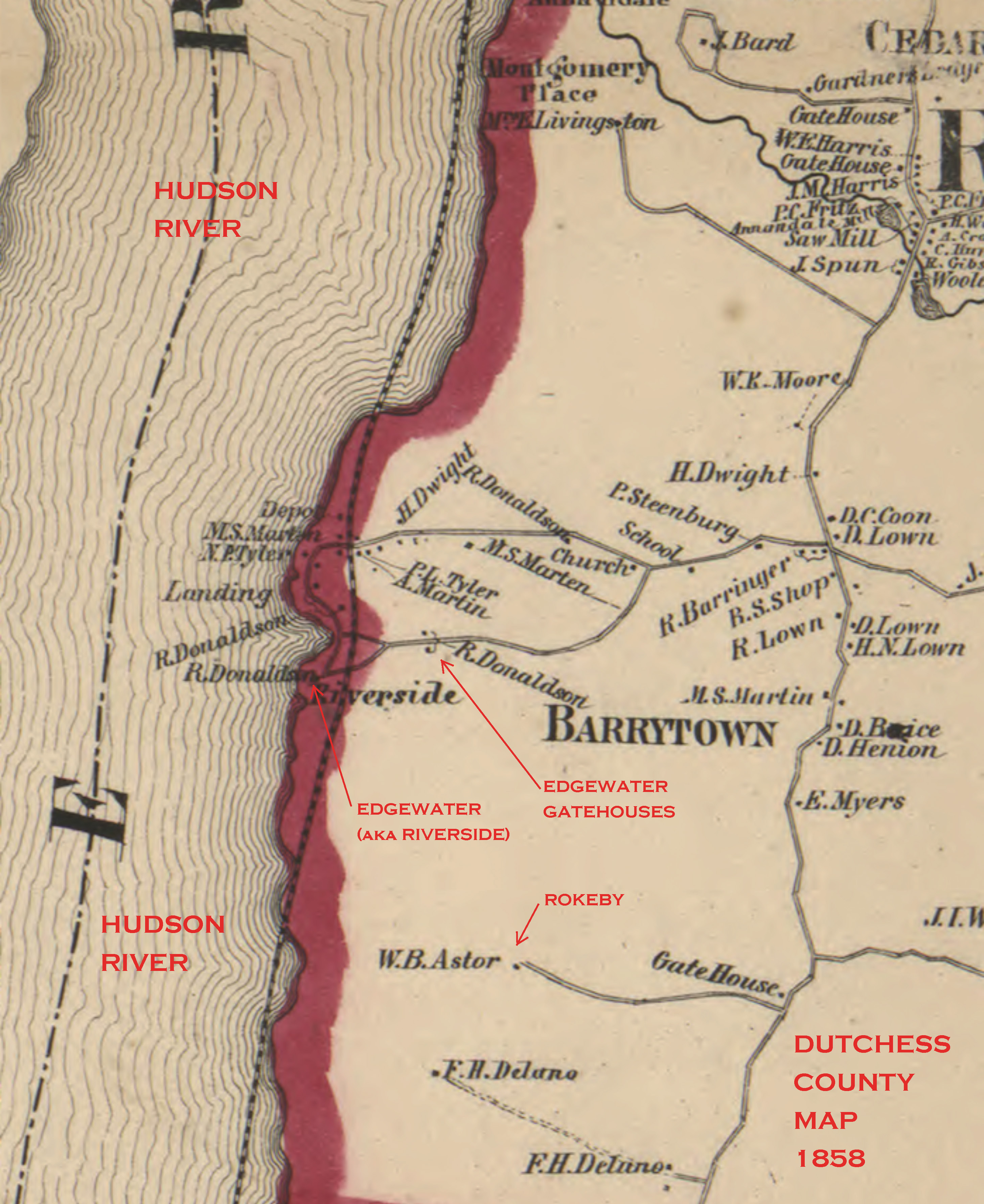
Map Excerpt, showing Edgewater (aka Riverside) in 1858.

Map Excerpt, showing Edgewater in 1867.

== Drawings ==
Main Floor Plan of Edgewater, measured about 1974.

Second Floor Plan of Edgewater, measured about 1974.

West Facade of Edgewater, measured about 1974.

Cross-Section of Edgewater, measured about 1974.

== Photographs ==
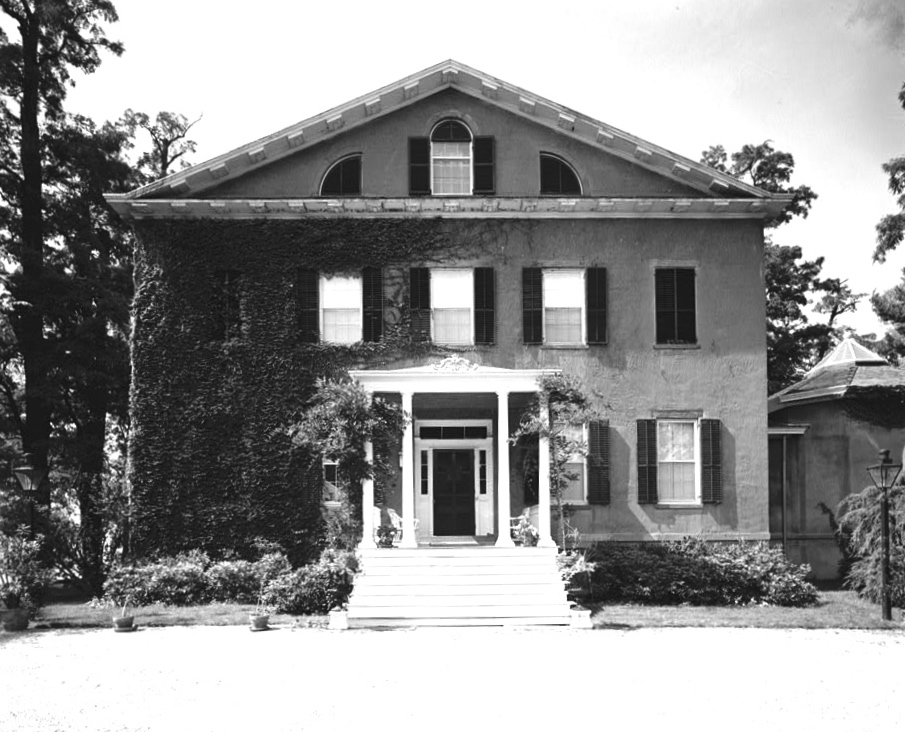
Entrance (East) facade in September 1979.

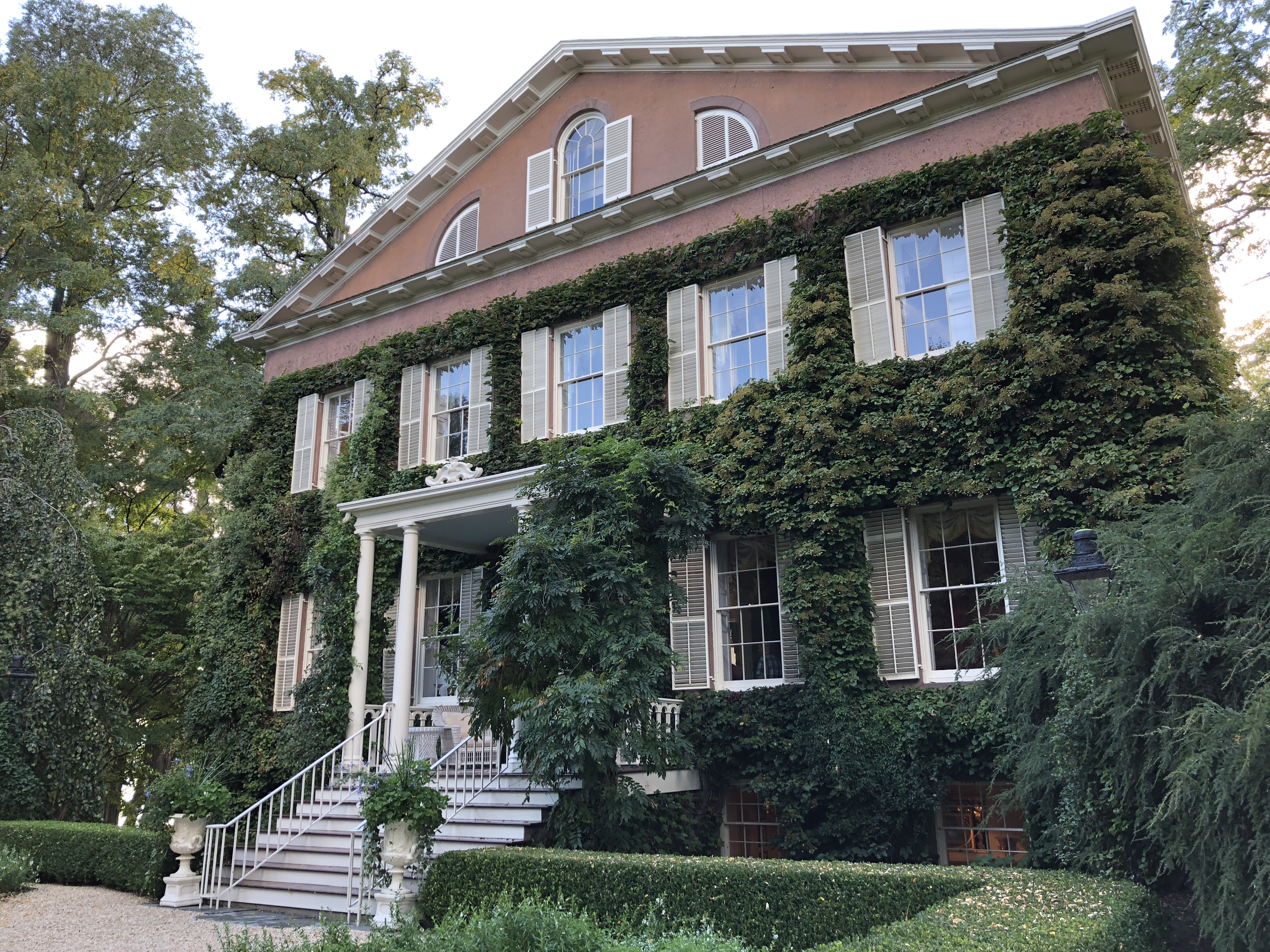
Entrance (East) facade in October 2018.

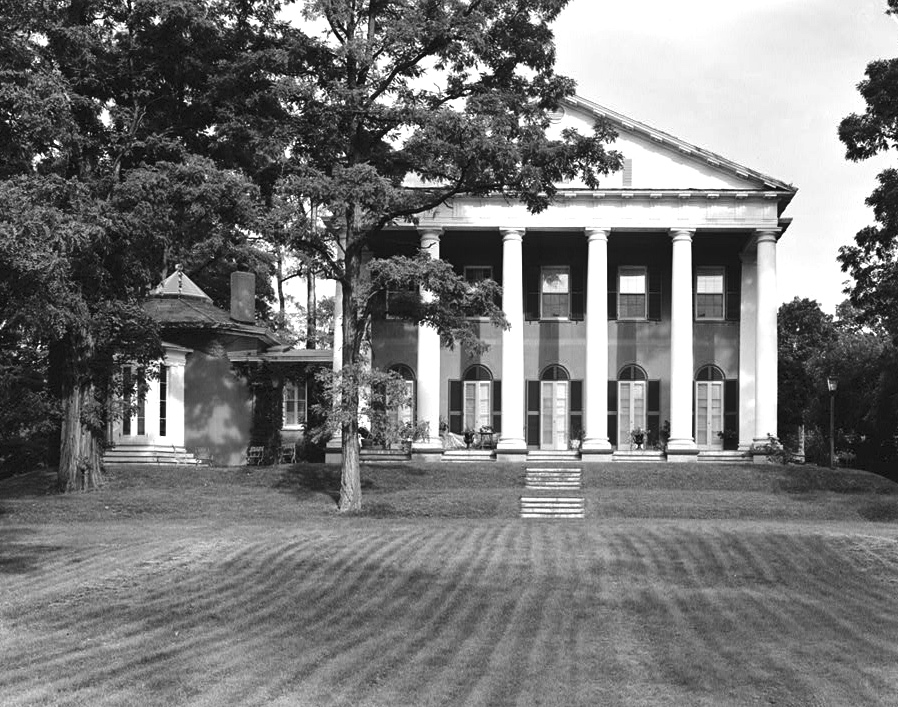
West facade in 1979.

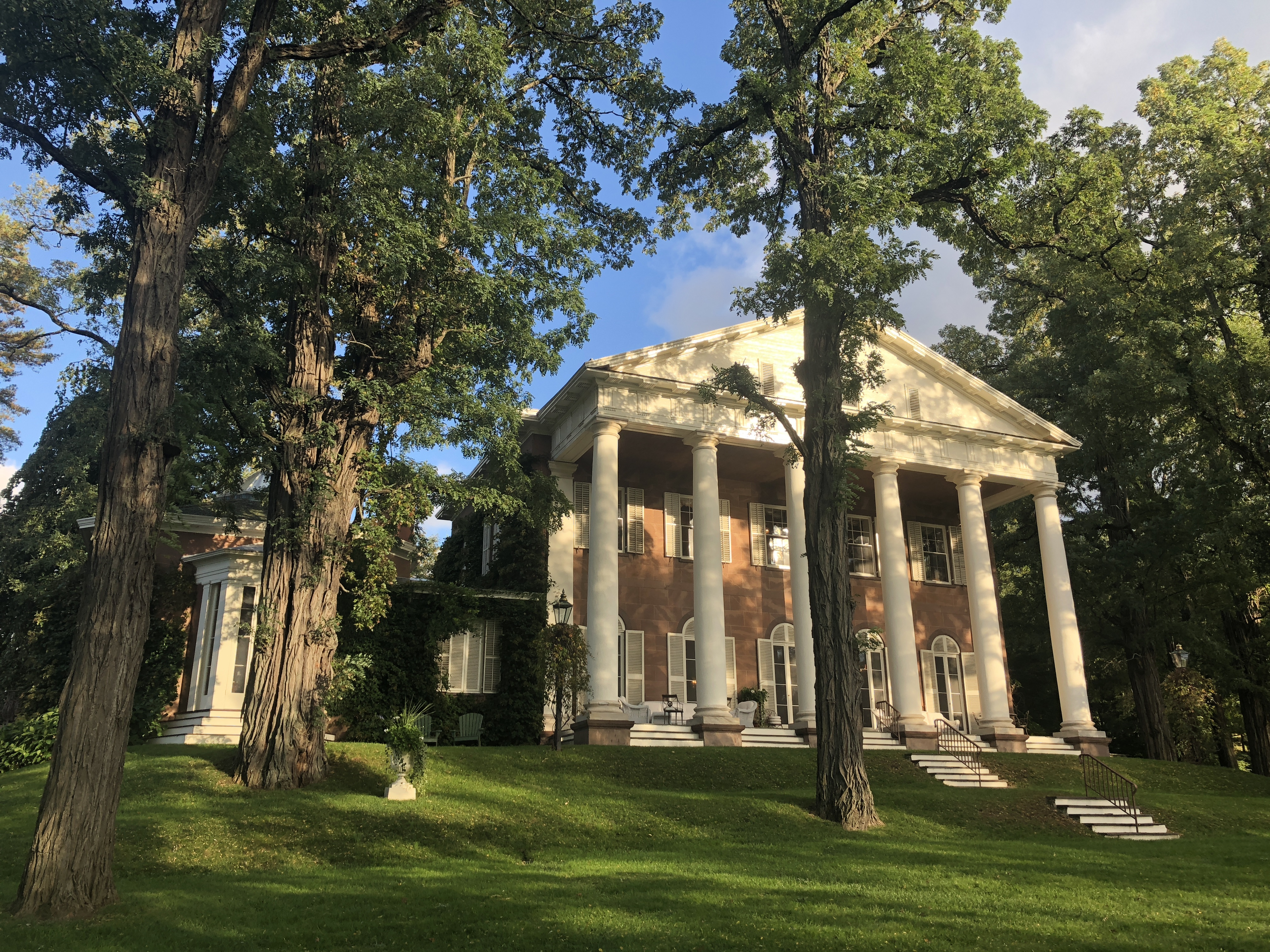
North and West facades in October 2018.

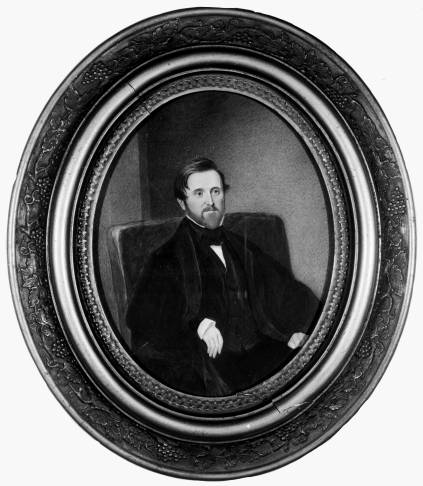
The architect Alexander Jackson Davis added an octagonal wing to Edgewater in the 1850s.

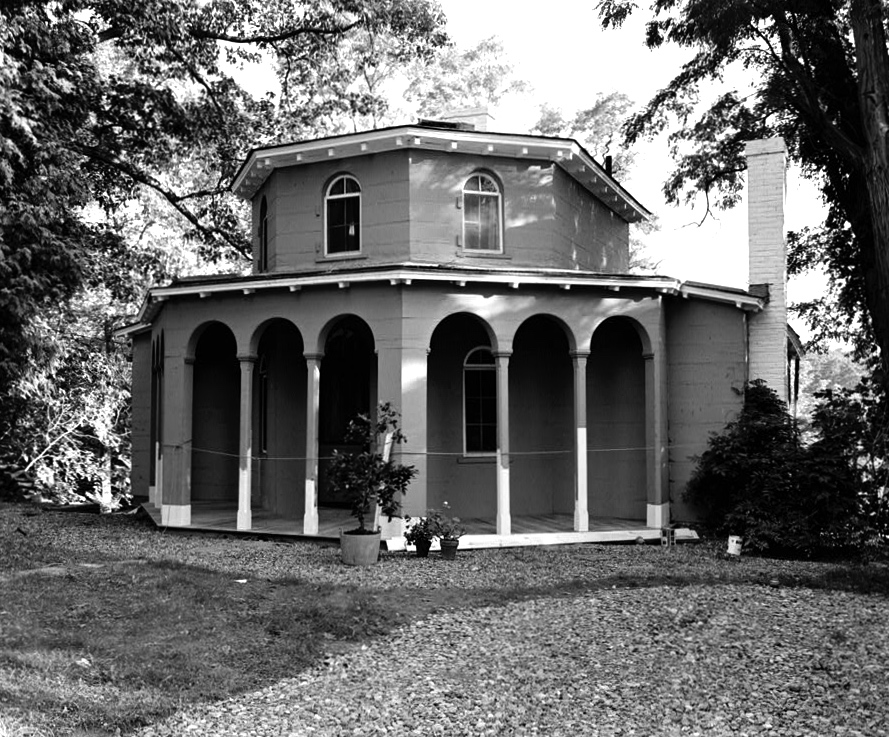
The South Gatehouse in 1979 (designed by the architect Alexander J. Davis).

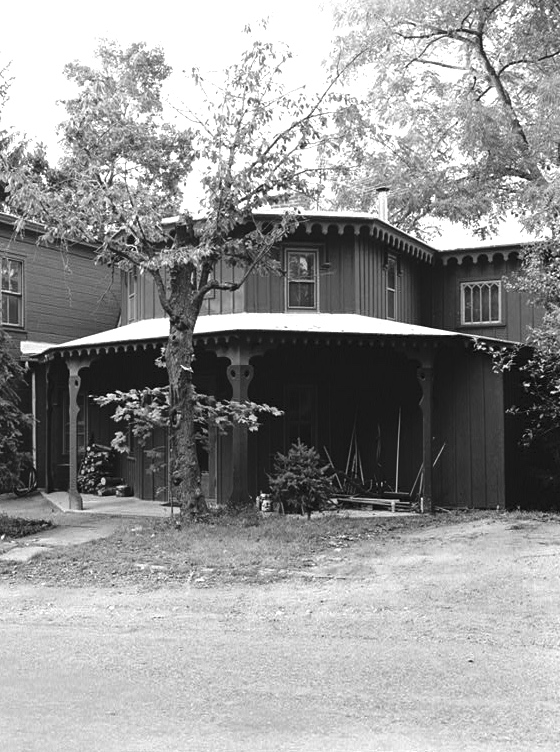
The North Gatehouse in 1979 (designed by the architect Alexander J. Davis).

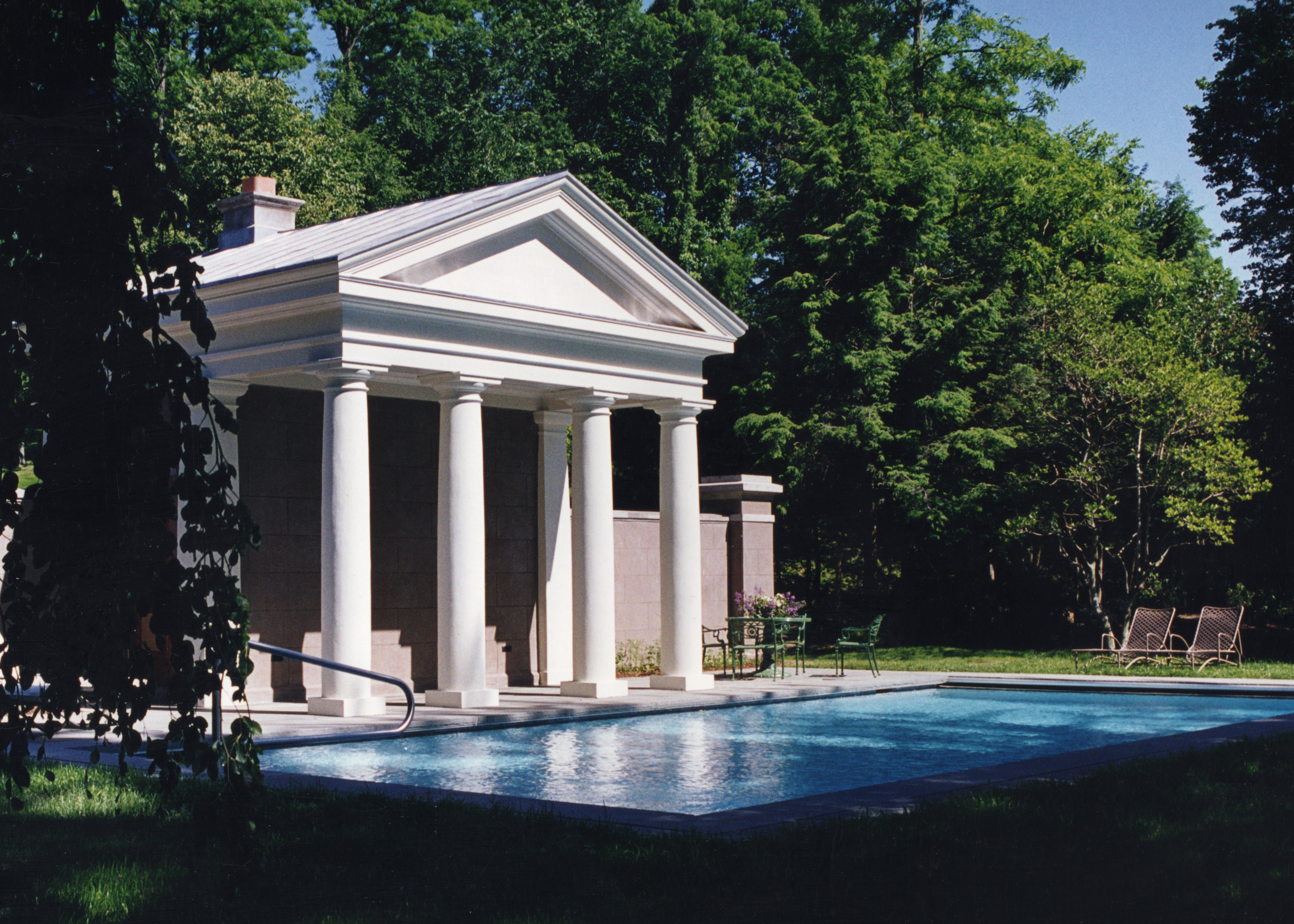
The Poolhouse in 1999 (designed by the architect Michael Dwyer).

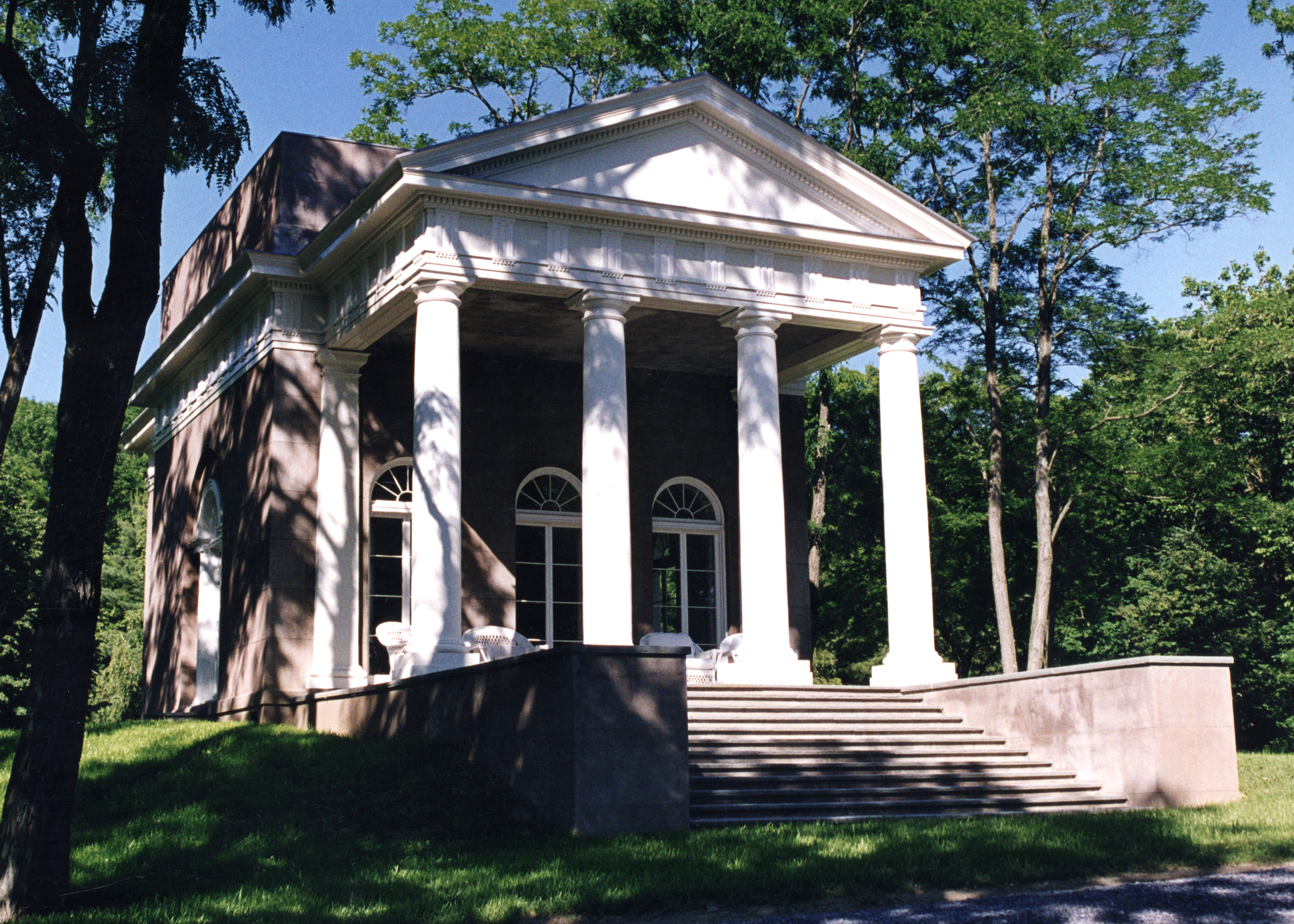
The Garden Pavilion in 1999 (designed by the architect Michael Dwyer).

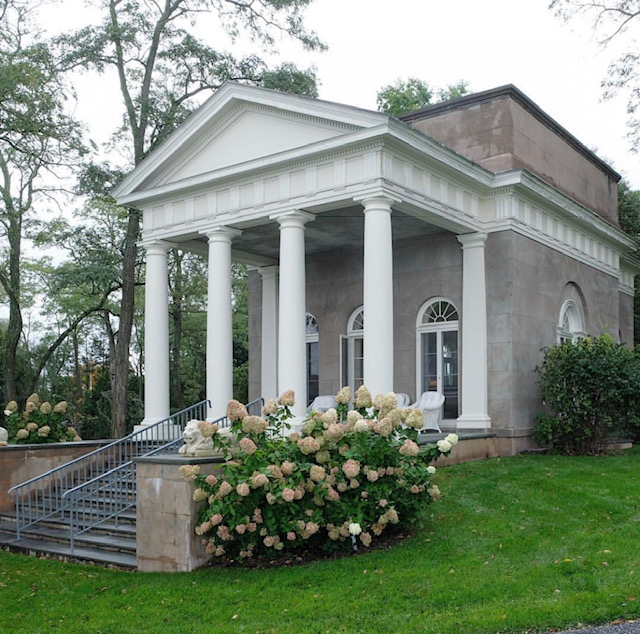
River facade of the Garden Pavilion in 2018.

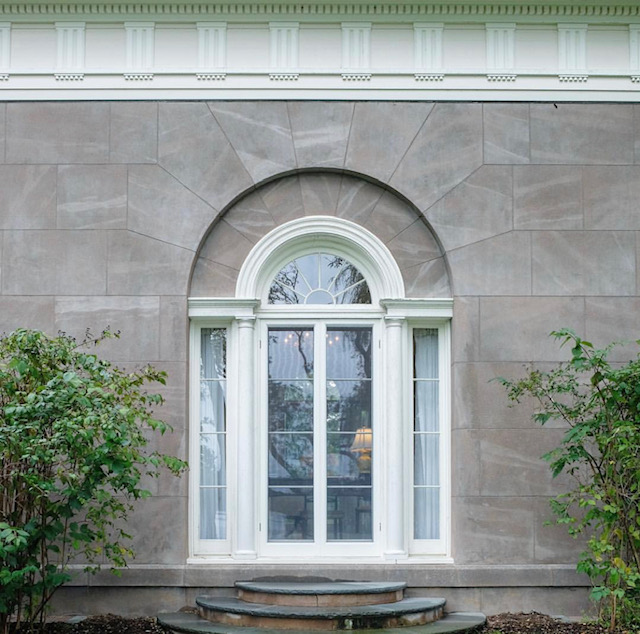
Venetian window of the Garden Pavilion in 2018.

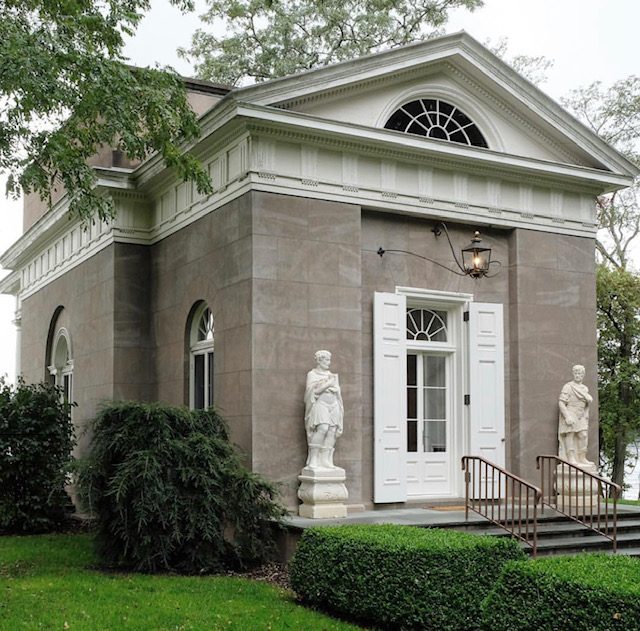
Entrance facade of the Garden Pavilion in 2018.
