= Elizabeth Chapman (disambiguation) =

Elizabeth Chapman (1919–2005) was a British children's author.

Elizabeth or Beth Chapman may also refer to:

- Elizabeth Chapman in United States National Cyclo-cross Championships
- Beth Chapman (politician), American politician
- Beth Chapman
