= Robert Donaldson Jr. =

American banker

- Born: June 15, 1800; Fayetteville, North Carolina, U.S.
- Died: June 18, 1872 (aged 72); Barrytown, New York, U.S.
- Education: University of North Carolina at Chapel Hill
- Spouse: Susan Jane Gaston (m. 1828; died 1866)
- Children: five
- Parent(s): Sarah Henderson Donaldson; Robert Donaldson Sr.
- Relatives: William Gaston (father-in-law)

Robert Donaldson Jr. (June 15, 1800 – June 18, 1872) was an American banker and patron of the arts.

== Early life ==
Robert Donaldson was born on June 15, 1800, in Fayetteville, North Carolina, the eldest of six children of Sarah (née Henderson) Donaldson and Robert Donaldson Sr., a Scottish born merchant who had consolidated his business at the trading center on Cape Fear River.

Donaldson was orphaned at the age of eight and was sent, along with his younger siblings, to live with relatives living nearby.

His brother James Donaldson married Alethea Lenox, a daughter of the New York based, Scottish-American merchant Robert Lenox. His sister Joanna Donaldson married Dr. Oliver Bronson, "heir to a wealthy Connecticut financier, banker, and real estate speculator." All of his sisters attended Mordecai Female Academy in Fayetteville.

In 1818, he graduated from the University of North Carolina at Chapel Hill, after which he traveled for five months through the mid-Atlantic. In 1820, he traveled to England, Scotland, and France. While in London, he inherited $300,000 (equivalent to $6,910,714 today) from the estate of Samuel Donaldson, a bachelor uncle who owned a prosperous commission house. In 1821, he commissioned Charles Robert Leslie to paint his portrait.

== Career ==
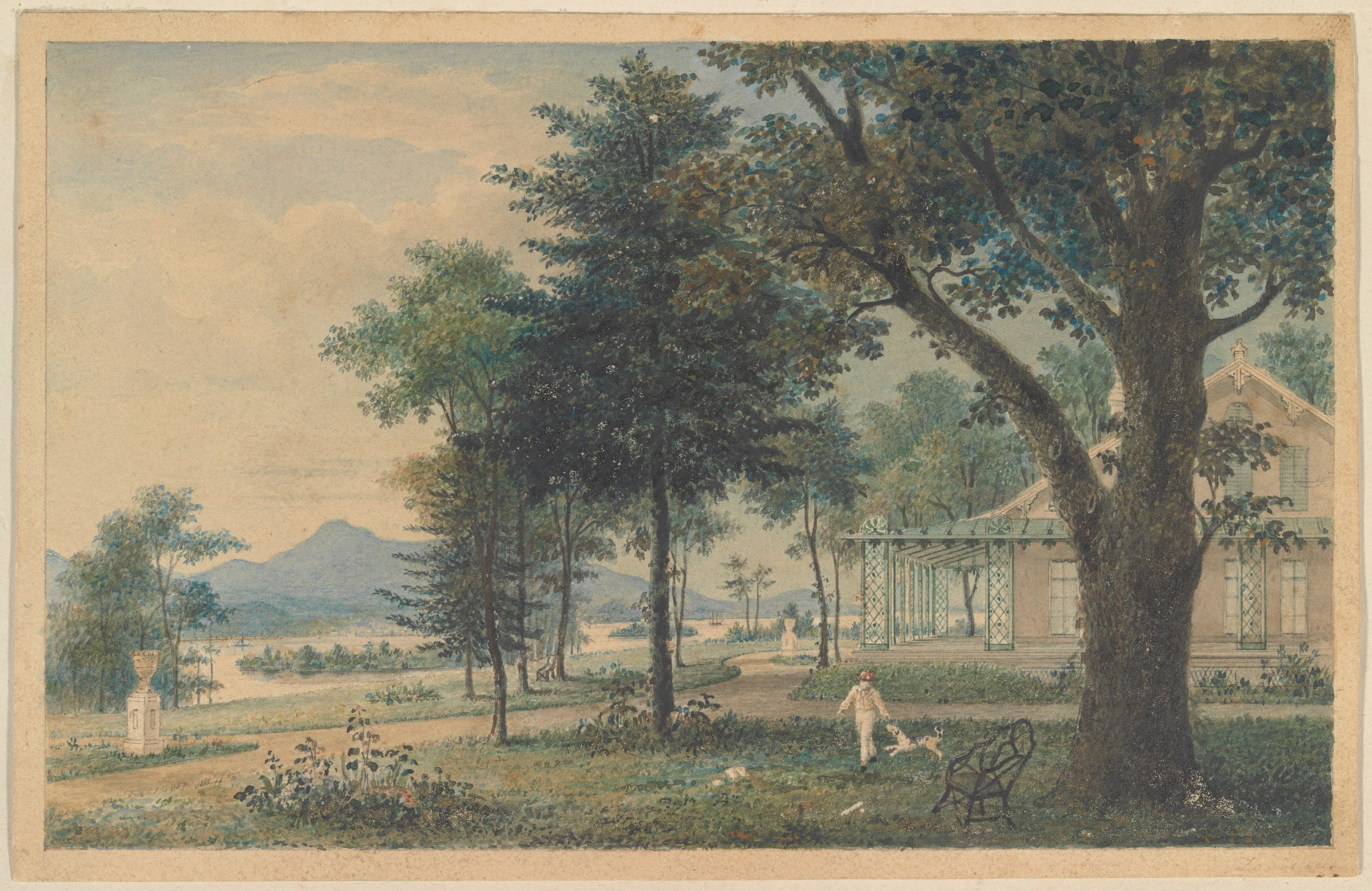
The cover of Andrew Jackson Downing's book, A Treatise on the Theory and Practice of Landscape featuring Dondaldson's home, Blithewood.

After returning to Fayetteville, Donaldson built the Lafayette Hotel in anticipation of the visit by General Gilbert du Motier, Marquis de Lafayette (to a town named in his honor) on March 4–5, 1825, during his grand tour of the United States.

In the early 1820s, Donaldson relocated to New York City and began working as a banker. He returned to North Carolina in 1828 where he married, after which he returned to New York with his wife, his younger brother, James, and two sisters. Once there, he became a patron of young artists and writers of the Romantic movement. In his 1837 book, Rural Residences, Donaldson's friend and architect, Alexander Jackson Davis, acknowledged Donaldson's support by describing him as "an ardent amateur of the rural arts." Downing also dedicated his 1847 book, Cottage Residences: Or, A Series of Designs for Rural Cottages and Cottage Villas, and their Gardens and Grounds adapted to North America. to Donaldson. He was friends with many prominent painters of the Hudson River School, including Asher Brown Durand, owned several important artworks including Gypsying Party by Leslie, The School of Athens, a copy of Raphael's fresco made by Morse for Donaldson in 1831, some Italian paintings, portraits, and several Dutch landscapes.

== Personal life ==
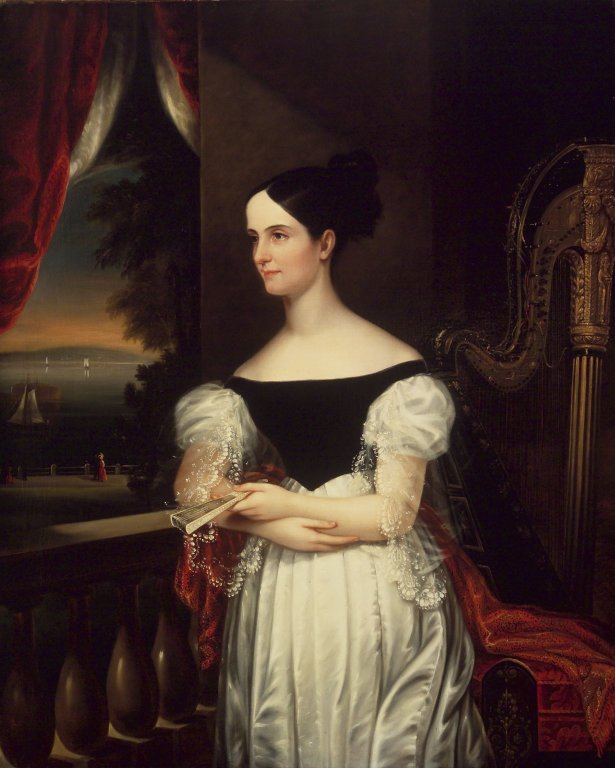
Mrs. Robert Donaldson (Susan Jane Gaston) by George Cooke, c. 1832.

In 1828, Donaldson married Susan Jane Gaston (1808–1866), the daughter of William Gaston, a judge and U.S. Representative from North Carolina, and his second wife, Hannah (née McClure) Gaston. Donaldson wanted to collect and publish his father-in-law's correspondences (including those with Daniel Webster, John Marshall, and John Church Hamilton) and writings while Gaston was living, but he declined. Together, they were the parents of:

- Robert Donaldson III (1838–1872), who died in Pueblo, Colorado, in February 1872.
- William Gaston Donaldson (1841-1906), who did not marry.
- Eliza Donaldson (1842–1897), who did not marry.
- Isabel Donaldson (1846–1931), who married her cousin, Robert Donaldson Bronson (1845–1912).
- Mary Susan Donaldson (1850–1868).

In 1845, Donaldson was said to be worth $200,000.

Donaldson died at Edgewater on June 18, 1872, in Barrytown, New York.

=== Residences ===
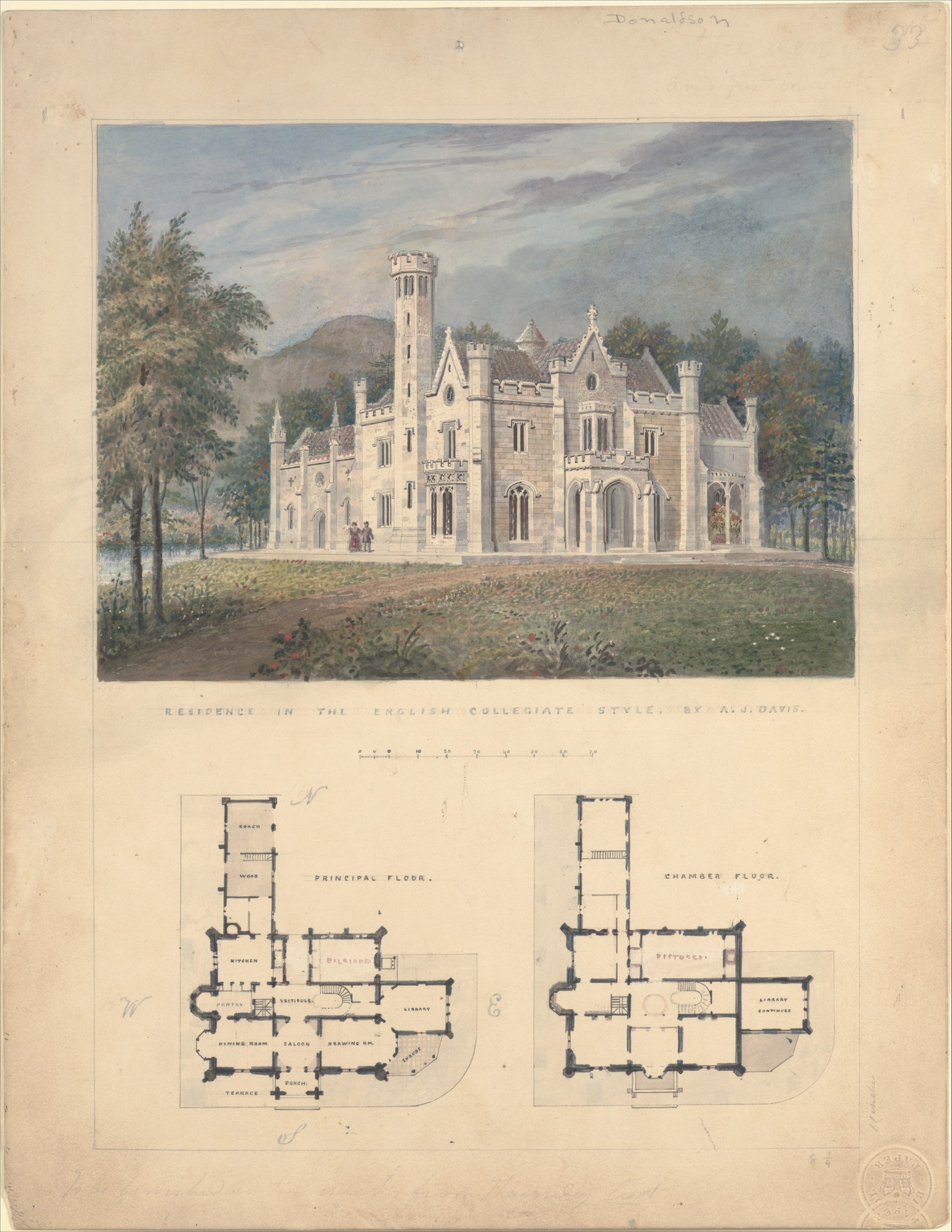
Design by Alexander Jackson Davis for an unbuilt villa for Donaldson in Fishkill Landing, New York, c. 1834.

In 1827, Donaldson purchased a house at 15 State Street in Manhattan, overlooking the Battery, previously owned by the merchant Archibald Gracie, and in 1819 the birthplace of the author Herman Melville. Donaldson hired his friend, the architect Alexander Jackson Davis, to renovate the house which he then decorated with sculptures by John Frazee, paintings by Samuel F. B. Morse and Charles Robert Leslie, and furniture by Duncan Phyfe. He owned the house until 1842 when he decided to live at Blithewood year-round.

==== Blithewood ====
In 1835, Donaldson purchased Annandale, a 92 acres (37 ha) estate on the Hudson River from John Church Cruger, the son-in-law of Stephen Van Rensselaer and the father of Stephen Van Rensselaer Cruger. Donaldson renamed the estate "Blithewood". The property was originally part of the Schuyler patent. In 1795 John Armstrong Jr. purchased a part of the Van Bentheusen farm, and converted the existing barn into a two-story twelve-room Federal style home.

Donaldson hired his friend Alexander Jackson Davis to turn the home into the rural Gothic style (as well as build a gatehouse (similar in style to the Henry Delamater House), and hired friend and horticulturist and landscape designer Andrew Jackson Downing to build an English garden with winding roads, waterfalls, and bridges. In 1853, he sold part of Blithewood to John Bard, who maintained the home and landscape and donated a portion of the estate to found St. Stephen's College (today known as Bard College). In 1899, after Bard's death, Andrew C. Zabriskie purchased the remaining estate, and hired the architect Francis L. V. Hoppin to raze Blithewood and build a new mansion, also known as Blithewood, which stands to this date.

==== Edgewater ====
In 1853, Donaldson purchased the Edgewater estate in Barrytown, New York, after the death of its original owner, Rawlins Lowndes Brown, from Brown's widow, Margaretta (née Livingston) Brown. In 1902, the executor of the Donaldson estate sold the house to Elizabeth Astor Winthrop Chanler. Years later, it was owned by writer Gore Vidal and financier Richard Jenrette.
