= Barrytown, New York =

Hamlet in New York, United States

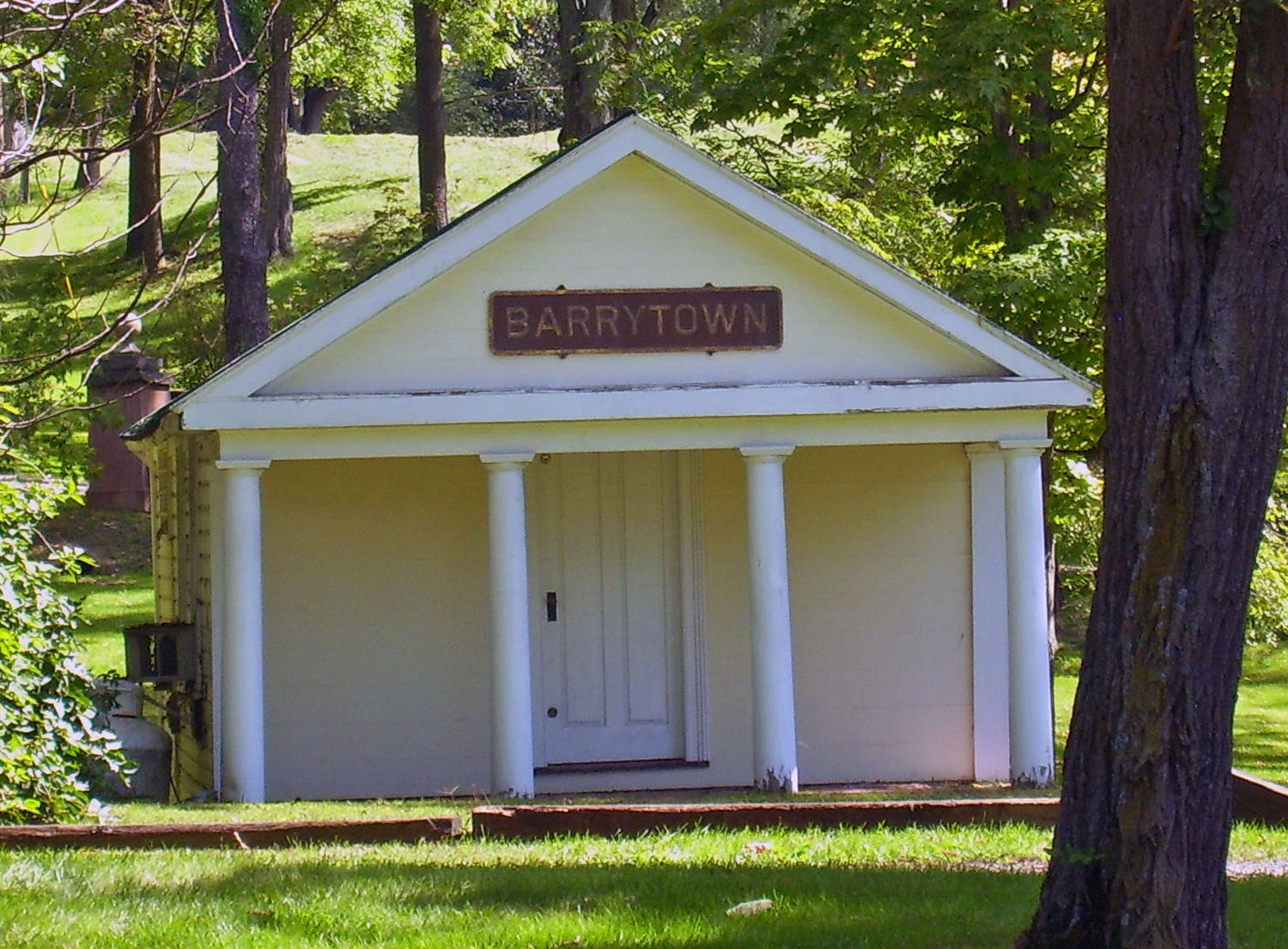
Former post office and general store at Barrytown

Barrytown is a hamlet (and census-designated place) within the town of Red Hook in Dutchess County, New York, United States. As of the 2020 census, Barrytown had a population of 100. It is within the Hudson River Historic District, a National Historic Landmark, and contains three notable Hudson River Valley estates: Edgewater, Massena and Rokeby.

== History ==
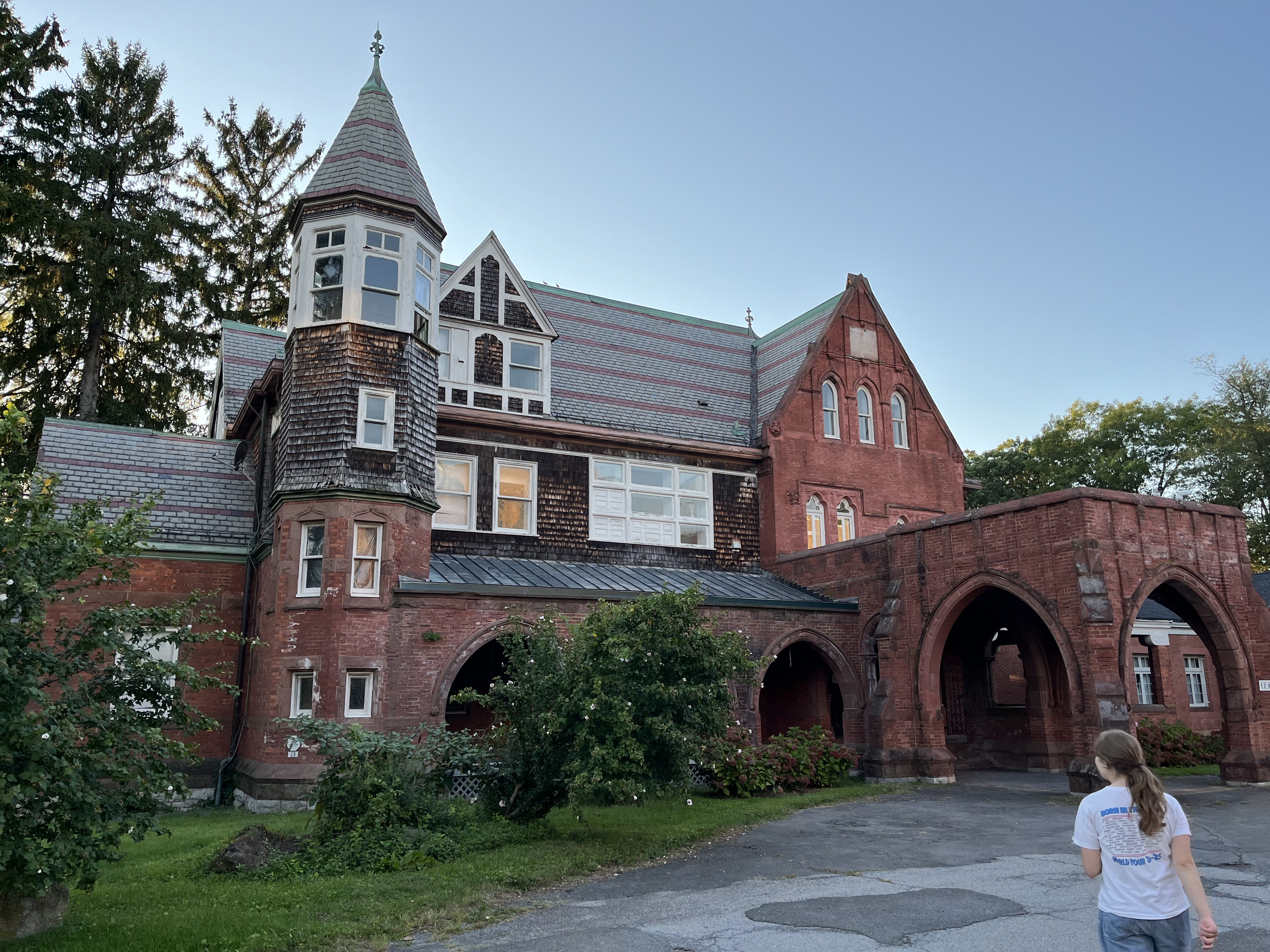
Massena House

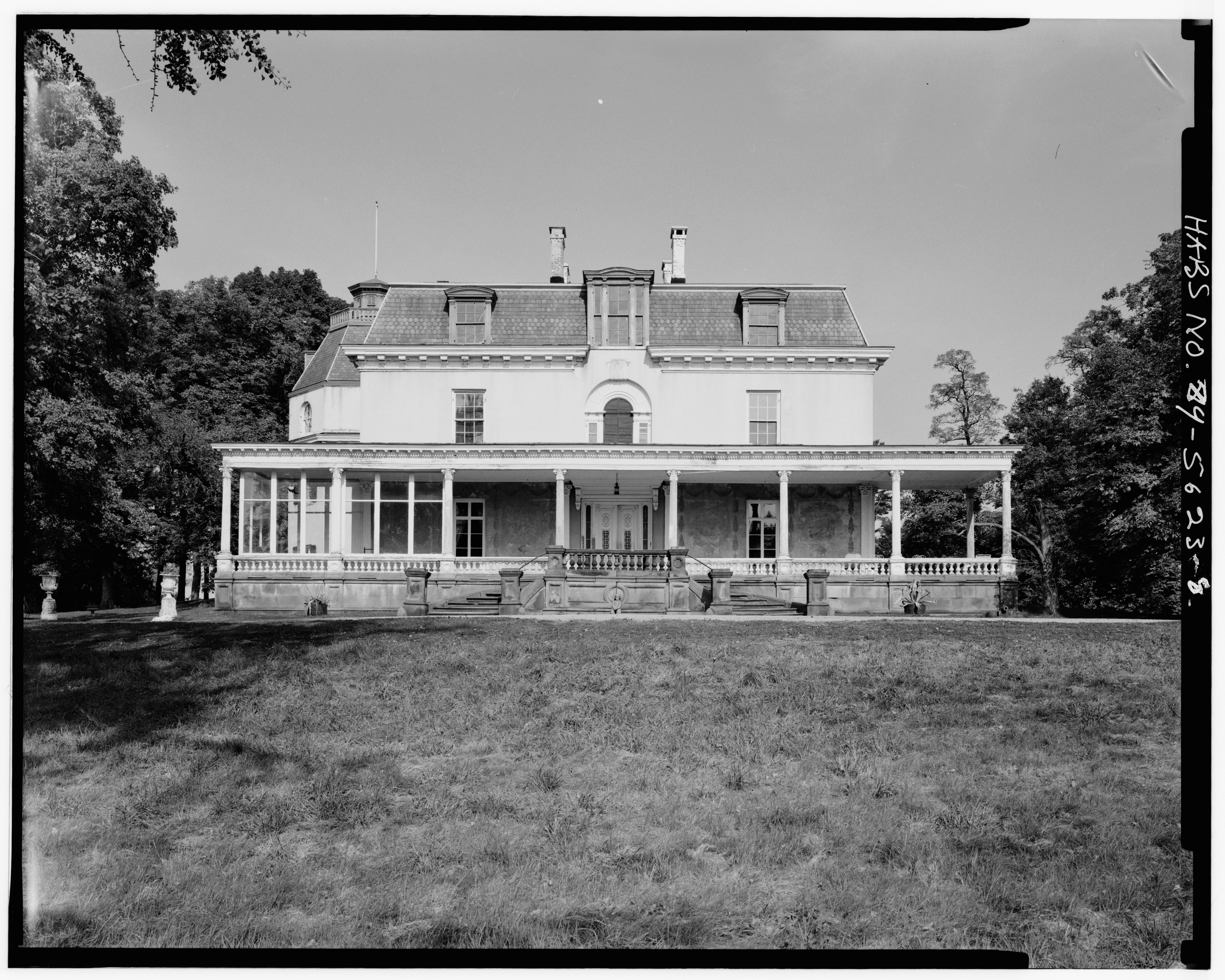
Rokeby Estate, also known as La Bergerie, River Road, Barrytown, Dutchess County

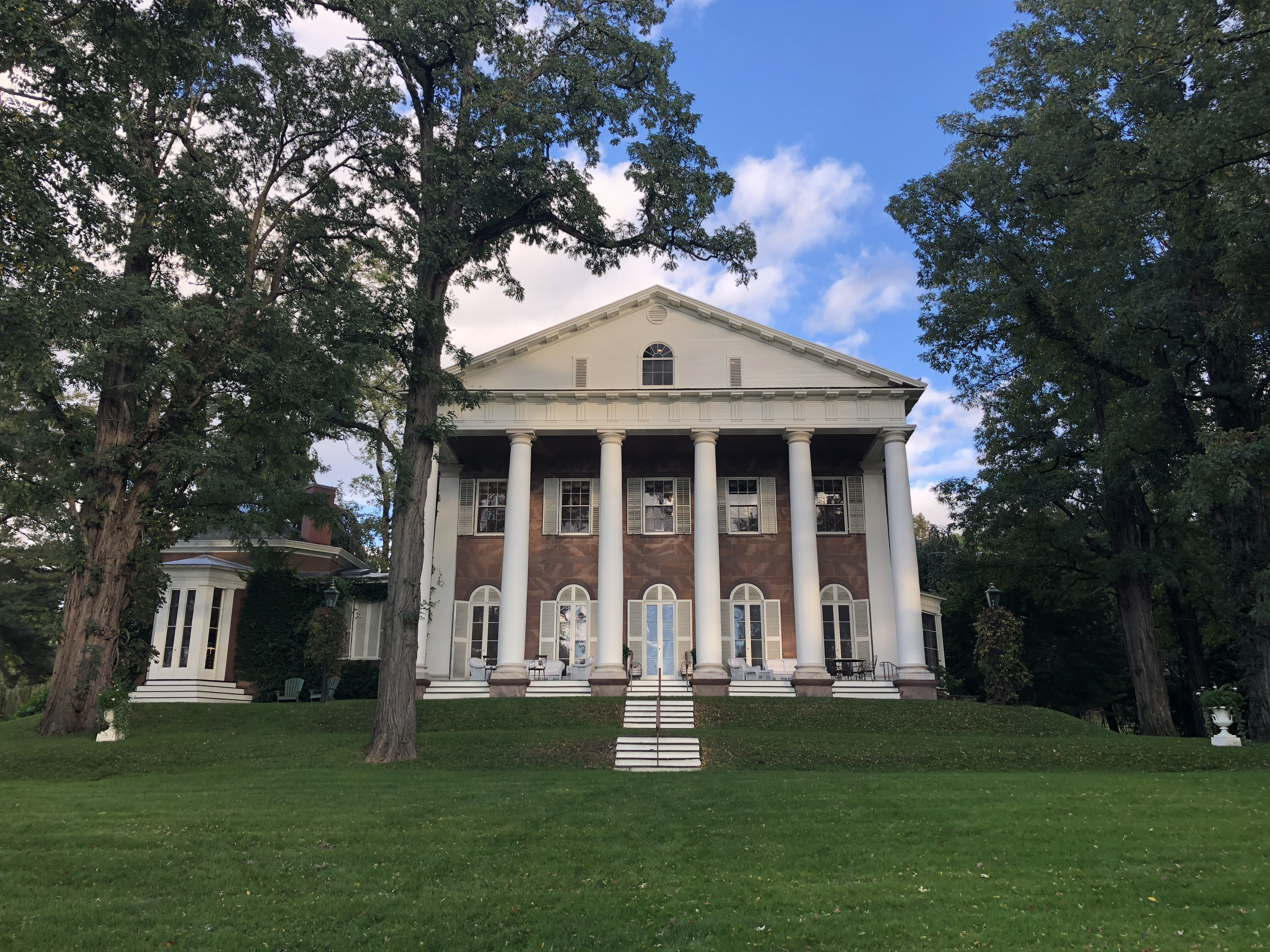
Edgewater

In 1791, Peter and Eleanor Contine kept store at what would later be called Barrytown Landing.

Barrytown was named in honor of President Andrew Jackson's Postmaster General, William Taylor Barry, who served in that capacity from 1829 to 1835. Barrytown is about 109 miles (175 km) from New York City.

The majority of the houses in Barrytown were built in the mid to late nineteenth century, often to house workers at the local estates and accompanying farms.

=== Estates ===
- "Massena" was first part of Livingston Manor and after the Lower Manor was split off, part of Clermont. Upon the death of his mother, Margaret Beekman Livingston, widow of Judge Robert Livingston of the Livingston family, John R. Livingston inherited land, much of which would later become Barrytown. (His sister Alida Livingston Armstrong inherited a section to the south, which would become "Rokeby"). John Livingston built a mansion in the style of a French chateau and called the estate "Massena", after André Massena, one of Napoleon's military commanders.
  In 1860, New York City merchant, John Aspinwall, purchased "Massena" as a summer home. Aspinwall was a supporter of John Bard and a significant benefactor to St. Stephen's College. In 1874, Jane Aspinwall established the Church of St. John the Evangelist in Barrytown in her husband's memory. Livingston's original mansion burned down in 1885, and Mrs. Aspinwall replaced it with a Victorian Gothic house designed by William Appleton Potter.
  When the Brothers of the Christian Schools' property in Amawalk was condemned to make way for the New Croton Reservoir, they relocated their novitiate to Pocantico. Around 1929, the Rockefeller family purchased the property. With the proceeds from the sale, the brothers of the New York District purchased the Massena estate at the northern section of the hamlet. They moved the novitiate there and established St. Joseph's Normal Institute as a teacher training facility. The Institute closed in 1969. In 1975 the property was bought by the Unification Church, where its Unification Theological Seminary was located. The property was again listed for sale in 2018. It was bought by Bard College in 2023 for $14 million, originally to serve as classroom, dorm, and office space. However, in November 2024, Bard College at Simon's Rock announced that it would be moving to Massena starting in fall 2025.
- In 1824, John R. Livingston gave the 250-acre "Edgewater" property to his daughter Margaretta and her husband, Rawlins Lowndes Brown. Brown died in 1852 and the following year, his widow sold the estate to New York financier Robert Donaldson Jr., who commissioned architect Alexander Jackson Davis to add an octagonal library wing. It is now owned by a preservation trust.
- "La Bergerie" (later called "Rokeby") was established about 1811 by General John Armstrong Jr., who purchased the land from his father-in-law, Judge Robert Livingston of Clermont. The Armstrongs raised sheep on the estate. Their daughter Margaret married William Backhouse Astor Sr. In 1835, the Astors purchased Rokeby and used it as a summer home.
- In September 1844, Laura Eugenia Astor, married merchant/financier Franklin Hughes Delano. As a wedding present, William Astor gave the couple the southernmost 100 acres of "Rokeby". The estate became known as "Steen Valetje" (which means "little stone valley" in Dutch).
  In 1849, the Astors and the Delanos commissioned German born landscape gardener Hans Jacob Ehlers to improve the grounds at "Rokeby" and "Steen Valetje", in the course of which he converted an old farm track into a woodland path called the "Poet's Walk" in honor of Washington Irving and Fitz-Greene Halleck who are said to have strolled there. It is now Poets' Walk Park, managed by Scenic Hudson.

David Johnson, of the Hudson River School, painted his View of the Hudson from Barrytown, New York in 1872.

=== Churches ===
The Episcopal Church of St. John the Evangelist was founded in 1874 by Jane Moore Breck Aspinwall in memory of her husband, John. The church was designed by William Appleton Potter.

The Sacred Heart Roman Catholic Church was established to serve the Irish Catholic population employed on the railroads and large estates. Prior to the building, they attended services across the river in Rondout and Saugerties, walking across the frozen river in winter or crossing by boat, weather permitting. On one occasion, a boat and its occupants narrowly missed a very tragic incident. Apparently, some members of the Donaldson family of Edgewater were on that boat. The Donaldson family donated the land for the church and cemetery at Barrytown. The cornerstone of the church was laid by Rev. Thomas S. Preston on October 17, 1875. Barrytown was a mission attended from St. Joseph's in Rhinecliff, by pastor James Fitzsimmons, until 1886 when Archbishop Corrigan appointed Rev. William J. McClure resident rector. The first burial in the Cemetery was November 23, 1886. The rectory was built in 1887.

In 1886, St. Sylvia's in Tivoli became a mission of Barrytown. As travelling to Barrytown proved hazardous in winter, in 1910, St. Christopher's in Red Hook was founded as a mission of Sacred Heart Parish. Sacred Heart once stood amid the bustle of rivercommerce, but over time, the population center shifted to Red Hook. Sacred Heart remained in use until 1969; it was suppressed as a parish in 1975. The building is now a private home.

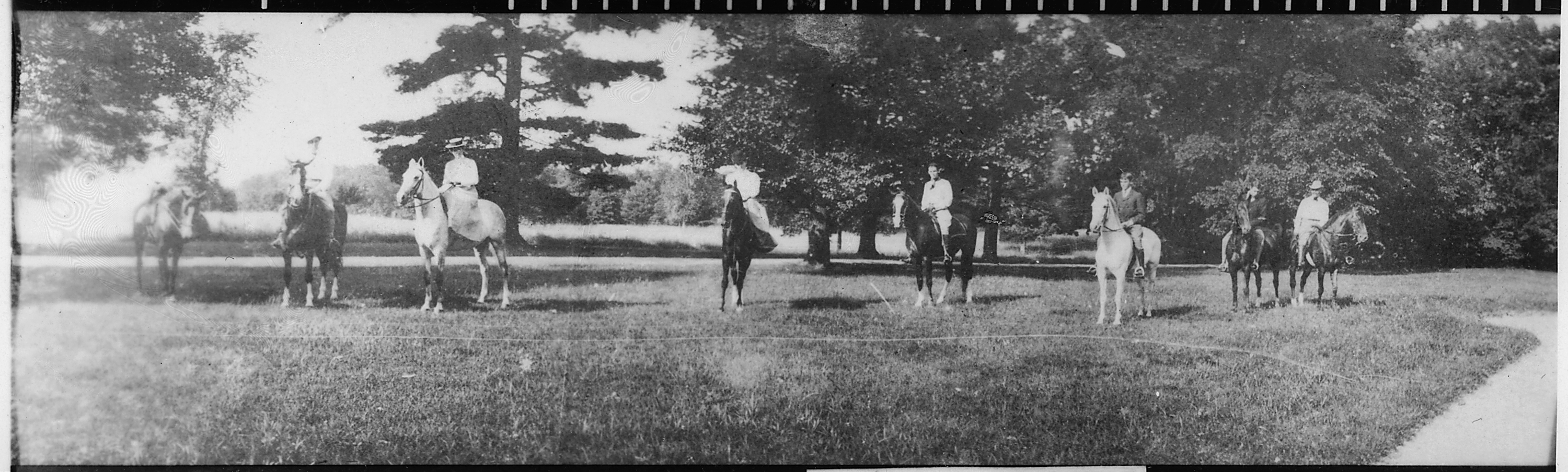
Horseback riders in Barrytown in 1902, including FDR

== Notable people associated with Barrytown ==
- The American architect Alexander Jackson Davis designed several structures in Barrytown, including the octagonal addition to the Edgewater main house and the estate's two octagonal gatehouses (1853), located across from each other on what is now Station Hill Road. The South gatehouse is currently home to Baroque cellist Christine Gummere.
- The American essayist and critic John Jay Chapman, a descendant of Chief Justice John Jay and grandson of the abolitionist Maria Weston Chapman, lived in Barrytown. His second wife, Elizabeth Chapman, owned the Edgewater estate from 1902 until 1917, and may have lived there briefly before the couple built the Sylvania estate on adjacent land.
- The author, playwright, screenwriter and journalist Gore Vidal lived at the Edgewater estate from 1950 to 1969.
- The artist Gary Hill lived on Station Hill Road from 1977 to 1984, initially as a tenant of artist/poet George Quasha and artist Susan Quasha, in whose Stained Glass Studio Hill's works were filmed, including Why Do Things Get in a Muddle? (Come On Petunia) (1984) He later returned to Barrytown to collaborate with poets George Quasha and Charles Stein.
- The author, translator, critic and New York Review of Books editor Daniel Mendelsohn lives in Barrytown.
- "Barrytown", a song recorded by Steely Dan for the 1974 album Pretzel Logic, was written by Donald Fagen, an alumnus of nearby Bard College, and uses Barrytown, New York as a paradigm to comment on the limits of the small town mindset.
