= Richard Jenrette =

American businessman

- Born: Richard Hampton Jenrette; April 5, 1929; Raleigh, North Carolina, U.S.
- Died: April 22, 2018 (aged 89); Charleston, South Carolina, U.S.
- Education: University of North Carolina at Chapel Hill; Harvard Business School
- Occupations: Businessman; founder of Donaldson, Lufkin & Jenrette
- Partner: William L. Thompson

Richard Hampton Jenrette (April 5, 1929 – April 22, 2018) was an American businessman who co-founded the investment bank Donaldson, Lufkin & Jenrette (DLJ).

== Early life ==
Jenrette was born on April 5, 1929, in Raleigh, North Carolina, the son of Joseph M. Jenrette, an insurance agent, and his wife, Emma Love Jenrette, a homemaker and an avid gardener. They lived in the Raleigh suburbs, according to Jenrette, in "a comfortable Tudor home." He graduated from Needham B. Broughton High School in 1947, and from the University of North Carolina at Chapel Hill in 1951. Jenrette worked for the New England Life Insurance Co. from 1951 to 1953, and was in the North Carolina National Guard from 1953 to 1955, after which he enrolled in the Harvard Business School where he earned an MBA in 1957.

== Business career ==
After graduating from Harvard, Jenrette worked at Brown Brothers Harriman & Co. from 1957 until 1959, when he co-founded Donaldson Lufkin Jenrette ("DLJ") with William H. Donaldson and Dan Lufkin. The firm concentrated on in-depth analysis, setting a new industry standard for institutional investing. Jenrette was instrumental in taking DLJ public in 1970, making it the first publicly traded investment firm in the United States.

Taking the helm of DLJ in 1973, he shepherded the firm through the recession of 1980–1983, and managed the firm’s sale in 1985 to the insurance firm The Equitable Companies Inc., where he became the chief investment officer. Jenrette was chairman and CEO of AXA Equitable from April 1990, until his retirement in 1996.

In addition to his career at DLJ and Equitable, Jenrette was a member of the Harvard University Board of Overseers; a director of the Associates of the Harvard Business School; a trustee of The Duke Endowment; and chairman and founder of the Classical American Homes Preservation Trust (renamed the Richard Hampton Jenrette Foundation in 2024).

== Restoration of historic houses ==
Beginning in the 1960s, Jenrette bought and restored a series of notable historic houses, such as the Robert William Roper House in Charleston, South Carolina; Millford in Pinewood, South Carolina; Ayr Mount in Hillsborough, North Carolina; 152 East 38th Street in New York City; the George F. Baker House in New York City; and Edgewater in Barrytown, New York, which he bought from author Gore Vidal in 1969.

At Edgewater, Jenrette built two new buildings, a garden pavilion (1997) and a poolhouse (1998), both designed by the architect Michael Dwyer.

== Personal life ==
Jenrette's longtime partner, William L. Thompson, died in 2013. Jenrette died of cancer on April 22, 2018, aged 89, in Charleston, South Carolina.

== Awards and honors ==
- Member of Phi Beta Kappa
- Order of the Golden Fleece, University of North Carolina
- Hon. Doctor of Laws (University of North Carolina at Chapel Hill)
- Hon. Doctor of Laws (Hamilton College, Clinton, New York)
- Hon. Doctor of Laws (The Citadel, Charleston, South Carolina)
- Hon. Doctor of Letters (The College of Charleston, University of South Carolina)
- Harvard Business School, Alumni Achievement Award (1984)
- University of North Carolina, Distinguished Alumnus Award (1986)
- University of North Carolina, William R. Davie Award (1999)
- American Assembly, Service to Democracy Award – Dwight D. Eisenhower Medal (1993)
- Chevalier of the Legion of Honor, given by the President of France (1996)
- Fellow of the American Academy of Arts and Sciences (1999)
- National Trust for Historic Preservation, Crowninshield Award (1996)
- World Monuments Fund, Hadrian Award (1998)

== Written works ==
- Richard H. Jenrette and John S. Chalsty. Donaldson Lufkin & Jenrette collection of Americana (New York, NY: Donaldson Lufkin & Jenrette, 1989).
- Richard H. Jenrette. Jenrette, the contrarian manager (New York, NY: McGraw-Hill, 1997).
- Richard H. Jenrette (author); John M. Hall (photographer). Adventures with old houses (Charleston, SC: Wyrick & Co., 2000), ISBN 0941711463.
- Richard H. Jenrette. More adventures with old houses: the Edgewater experience (New York, NY: Classical American Homes Preservation Trust, 2009). ISBN 9780982573709.
- Richard H. Jenrette. Columns by the sea: the Roper House, Charleston, S.C. (New York, NY: Classical American Homes Preservation Trust, 2013), ISBN 9780982573716.

== See also ==
- Edgewater (Barrytown, New York)
- George F. Baker Jr. House (67 East 93rd Street, New York City)
- George F. Baker Jr. House (69 East 93rd Street, New York City)
