= Elizabeth Chapman =

British children's author (1919–2005)

- Born: Constance Elizabeth Chapman; 1919; Barnsley
- Died: 2005
- Other name: Constance Elizabeth Mann Chapman
- Occupation: children's book author
- Years active: 1954-1985
- Known for: series of children's books about a red lorry named Marmaduke

Constance Elizabeth Chapman (1919–2005) was a British children's author who created a series of books based on a fictional red lorry called "Marmaduke". The series began in the 1950s. The Marmaduke books were also published in Dutch (where Marmaduke became "Marmaduk") and in Swedish (where Marmaduke became "Lastbilen Teo.") The audio of the books was originally recorded by Kenneth Williams. They were published by Brockhampton Press. According to OCLC WorldCat Identities, she is the author of "37 works in 65 publications in 3 languages and 423 library holdings."

== Titles ==
- Riding With Marmaduke. (1955) could be an alternate title
- Marmaduke the Lorry [1]
- Marmaduke and Joe [2]
- Adventures with Marmaduke [3]
- Merry Marmaduke [4]
- Marmaduke and His Friends [5]
- Marmaduke and the Elephant [6] (1959)
- Marmaduke And The Lambs [7]
- Marmaduke Goes to France [8]
- Marmaduke Goes to Holland [9]
- Marmaduke Goes to America [10]
- Marmaduke Goes to Wales
- Marmaduke Goes to Spain
- Marmaduke Goes to Italy
- Marmaduke Goes to Ireland
- Marmaduke Goes to Morocco
- Marmaduke Goes to Scotland
- Marmaduke Goes to Switzerland
