= John Jay Chapman =

American author

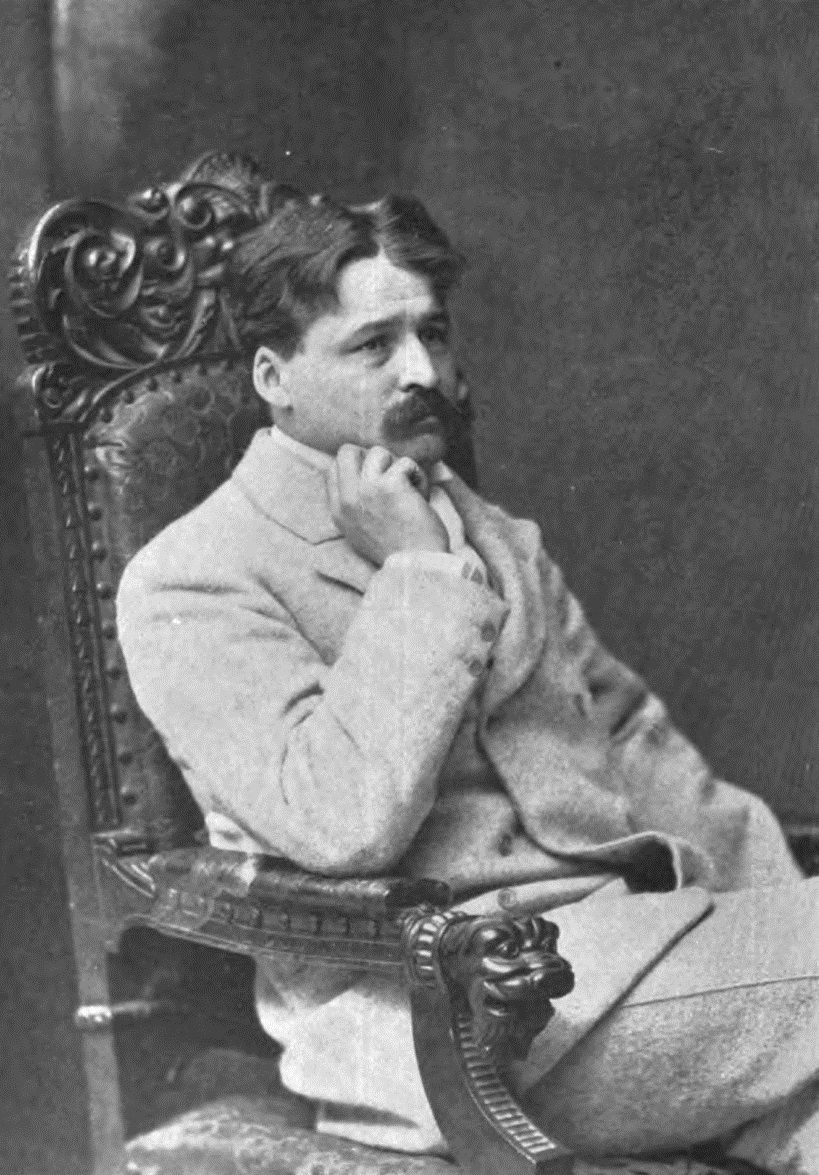
- John Jay Chapman, 1899
- Born: March 2, 1862; New York City, New York, U.S.
- Died: November 4, 1933 (aged 71); Poughkeepsie, New York, U.S.
- Education: Harvard University
- Occupations: Literary critic, essayist, lecturer, journalist, writer
- Spouses: Minna Timmins (m. 1889; died 1897) Elizabeth Astor Winthrop Chanler (m. 1899)
- Children: Four, including Victor
- Relatives: John Jay (grandfather)
- Writing career
- Notable works: Causes and Consequences, Practical Agitation

Signature
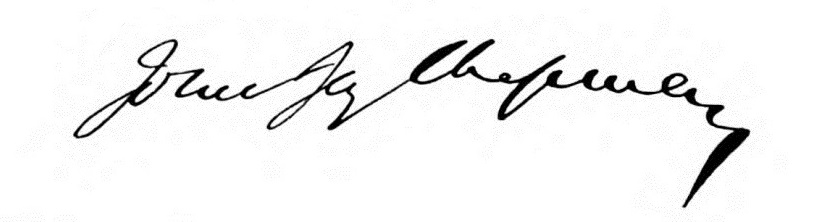

John Jay Chapman (March 2, 1862 – November 4, 1933) was an American writer and lawyer. He was most known for his essays and poetry.

== Early life ==
Chapman was born in New York City on March 2, 1862. He was a son of Henry Grafton Chapman Jr. (1833–1883), a broker who became president of the New York Stock Exchange, and Eleanor Kingsland Jay (1839–1921).

His paternal grandmother, Maria Weston Chapman, was one of the leading campaigners against slavery and worked with William Lloyd Garrison on The Liberator. His maternal grandfather was John Jay, the U.S. Minister to Austria-Hungary and a son of William Jay and a grandson of John Jay, a founding father and chief justice of the United States Supreme Court.

Chapman was educated at St. Paul's School, in Concord, New Hampshire, and at Harvard University. After graduating from Harvard in 1884, he toured Europe before resuming his studies at the Harvard Law School.

== Career ==
He was admitted to the bar in 1888, and practiced law until 1898. Meanwhile, he had attracted attention as an essayist of unusual merit. His work is marked by originality and felicity of expression, and the opinion of many critics has placed him in the front rank of the American essayists of his day.

In 1912, on the one-year anniversary of the lynching of Zachariah Walker in Coatesville, Pennsylvania, Chapman gave a speech in which he called the lynching "one of the most dreadful crimes in history" and said "our whole people are...involved in the guilt." It was published as A Nation's Responsibility.

Chapman became involved in politics and joined the City Reform Club and the Citizens' Union. He was opposed to the Tammany Hall political and business grouping, which at that time dominated New York City. He lectured on the need for reform and edited the journal The Political Nursery (1897-1901).

== Personal life ==
Chapman was known as a passionate romantic in his personal life as well as his writing. While a law student at Harvard, he beat astronomer Percival Lowell in a fist fight over a woman, then as penance deliberately burned his left hand so badly it needed amputated. He would later brandish the stump as evidence of his passion.

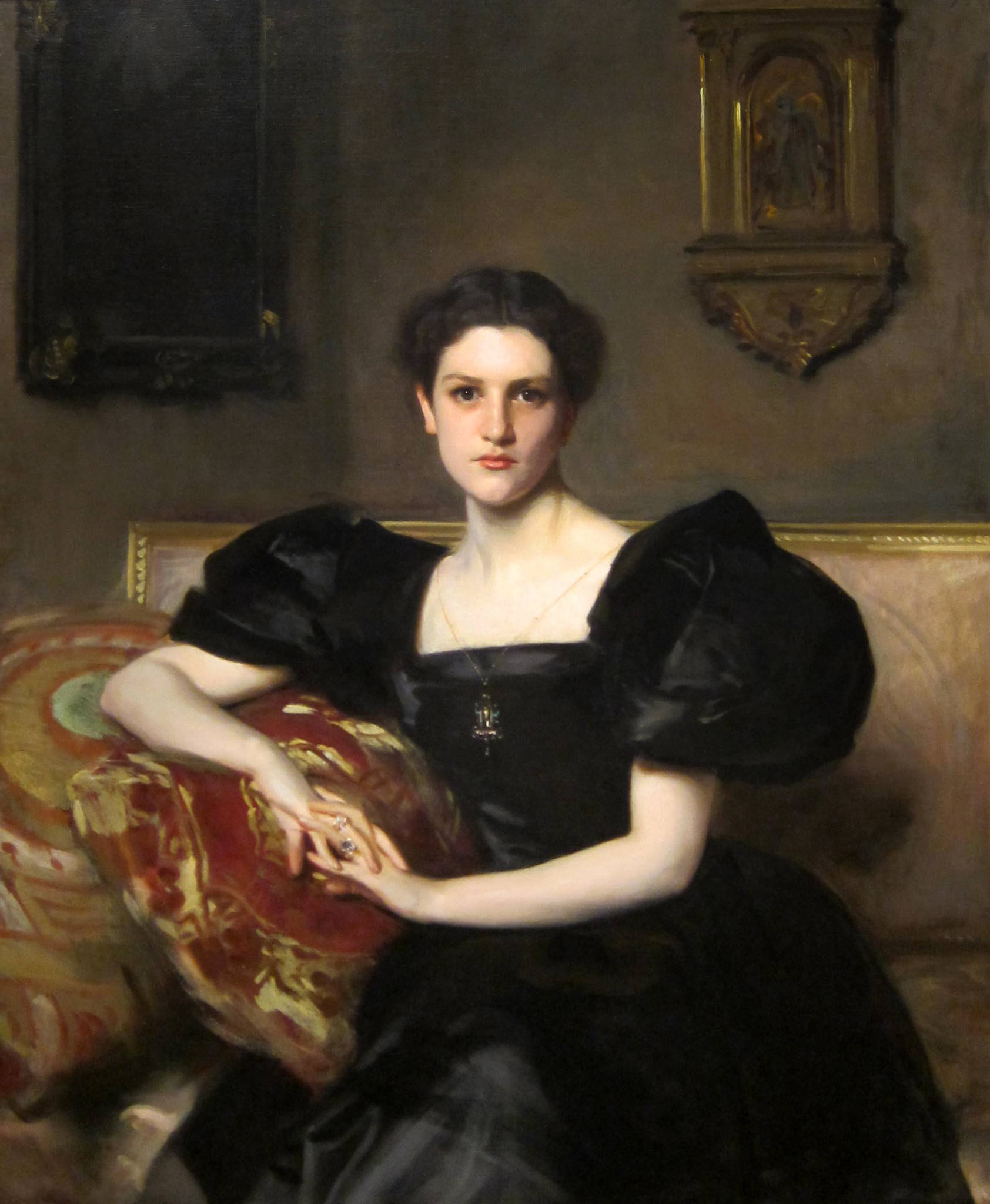
Portrait of Chapman's second wife, Elizabeth Astor Winthrop Chanler (1866-1937), by John Singer Sargent.

On July 2, 1889, he married Minna Timmins (1861–1897), with whom he had three children:

- Victor Emmanuel Chapman (1890–1916), the first American aviator to die in France during World War I. After Victor's death, Chapman published a memoir of his son's early life, including his letters sent from France. The letters inspired the composer Charles Loeffler, a friend of Chapman's, to write the string quartet Music for Four Stringed Instruments.
- John Jay Chapman, Jr. (1893–1903), who drowned at Romerbad, Austria, age 9.
- Conrad Chapman (1896–1989), who was engaged to Dorothy Daphne McBurney (1912–1997) in 1934, but married Judith Daphne Kemp (1906–1999) in England in 1937.

On April 23, 1899, Chapman married Elizabeth Astor Winthrop Chanler (1866–1937), the second daughter of John Winthrop Chanler and Margaret Astor Ward (of the Astor family). The soldier and explorer William A. Chanler was her brother. They had one child:

- Chanler Armstrong Chapman (1901–1982), who married Olivia James, a niece of Henry James. They divorced and in 1948, he married the former Helen Riesenfeld, a writer. After her death in 1970, he married Ida R. Holzbert Wagman in 1972. Chanler Chapman reportedly served as a model for Eugene Henderson, the main character in Saul Bellow's 1959 novel Henderson the Rain King.

John Jay Chapman died on November 4, 1933, in Poughkeepsie, New York. His funeral, held at Christ Church on West 71st Street, New York City, was attended by hundreds. Elizabeth Chapman died in 1937.

== Selected publications ==
=== Non-fiction ===
- (1898). Emerson and Other Essays.
- (1898). Causes and Consequences.
- (1900). Practical Agitation.
- (1911). Learning and Other Essays.
- (1913). William Lloyd Garrison [second edition, revised and enlarged, 1921].
- (1914). Deutschland Uber Alles; or, Germany Speaks.
- (1915). Notes on Religion.
- (1915). Memories and Milestones.
- (1915). Greek Genius and Other Essays.
- (1917). Victor Chapman's Letters from France, [with memoir by John Jay Chapman].
- (1922). A Glance toward Shakespeare.
- (1924). Letters and Religion.
- (1931). Lucian, Plato and Greek Morals.
- (1932). New Horizons in American Life.

=== Fiction ===
- (1892). The Two Philosophers: A Quaint, Sad Comedy.
- (1908). Four Plays for Children.
- (1908). The Maid's Forgiveness: A Play.
- (1909). A Sausage from Bologna: A Comedy in Four Acts.
- (1910). The Treason and Death of Benedict Arnold: A Play for a Greek Theater.
- (1911). Neptune's Isle and Other Plays for Children.
- (1914). Homeric Scenes: Hector's Farewell, and The Wrath of Achilles.
- (1916). Cupid and Psyche.
- (1919). Songs and Poems.

=== Articles ===
- (1909). "The Harvard Classics and Harvard," Science, Vol. 30, No. 770 (Oct. 1, 1909), pp. 440–443.
- (1910). "Professorial Ethics," Science, Vol. XXXII, pp. 5–9.
- (1920). "A New Menace to Education," Meredith College: Quarterly Bulletin, Series 13, Nos. 1–2.

=== Translations ===
- (1927). Dante.
- (1928). Two Greek Plays.
- (1930). The Antigone of Sophocles.

=== Collected works ===
- (1957). The Selected Writings of John Jay Chapman, Jacques Barzun (Editor).
- (1970). The Collected Works of John Jay Chapman, 12 Vol., Melvin H. Bernstein (Editor).
- (1998). Unbought Spirit: A John Jay Chapman Reader, Richard Stone (Editor), (Foreword by) Jacques Barzun.
