= Henry T. Sloane House =

Building in Manhattan, New York

- The main facade on 72nd Street (2026)
- Interactive map of the Henry T. Sloane House area
- Alternative names: 9 East 72nd Street

General information
- Type: Mansion
- Architectural style: Beaux-Arts
- Location: 9 East 72nd Street, Manhattan, New York, United States
- Coordinates: 40°46′20″N 73°57′58″W
- Construction started: 1894
- Completed: 1896
- Client: Henry T. Sloane
- Owner: Government of Qatar

Technical details
- Floor count: 5
- Floor area: 45,000 square feet (4,200 m^{2}) (with 7 East 72nd Street)

Design and construction
- Architect: Carrère and Hastings

The Henry T. Sloane House is a mansion at 9 East 72nd Street on the Upper East Side of Manhattan in New York City. It is along 72nd Street's northern sidewalk between Fifth Avenue and Madison Avenue. The five-story building was designed by Carrère and Hastings in the French Beaux-Arts style, and was built from 1894 to 1896. The house, along with the neighboring structure at 7 East 72nd Street, has been owned since 2002 by the government of Qatar, which has combined the two buildings into a single residence.

The limestone facade is divided vertically into four bays and rises four stories from the street. The facade includes rusticated limestone blocks on the first story, a colonnade of Ionic columns on the second and third stories, and a mansard roof on the fourth story. The house originally spanned 25,363 square feet (2,356.3 m^{2}), with various living spaces on the second floor and bedrooms on the upper stories. After 7 and 9 East 72nd Street were combined, the residence included a swimming pool and a roof terrace.

The building was originally constructed for the family of Henry T. Sloane, son of the founder of the carpet firm W. & J. Sloane. Following an acrimonious divorce, Sloane abandoned the house in 1899, and the family of Joseph Pulitzer rented it the next year. In 1901, it was purchased by the banker James Stillman, who lived there until his death in 1918. The house was then occupied by the carpet manufacturer John Sanford and then by the Riker family. The Lycée Français de New York, which already occupied the neighboring mansion at 7 East 72nd Street, moved into the house in 1964. The house became a New York City designated landmark in 1977. The school vacated 7 and 9 East 72nd Street in 2002, when they were sold to Hamad bin Khalifa Al Thani, the Emir of Qatar. After the Qatari government finished renovating and combining the buildings in 2010, the two structures comprised New York City's largest single-family residence.

== Site ==
The Henry T. Sloane House is at 9 East 72nd Street, along the northern side of 72nd Street between Fifth Avenue and Madison Avenue, on the Upper East Side of Manhattan in New York City. The house originally had a frontage of 59 feet (18 m) on 72nd Street and a north–south depth of 102 feet (31 m). Since 2010, the house has been connected with the former Oliver Gould Jennings House at 7 East 72nd Street, immediately to the west, forming a single residence. The two houses collectively occupy a single rectangular land lot of 8,923 square feet (829.0 m^{2}), with a frontage of 87.33 feet (26.62 m) and a north–south depth of 102.17 feet (31.14 m). Notable buildings nearby include the Pulitzer Mansion on the block to the north; 907 Fifth Avenue and 9 East 71st Street on the block to the south; and the Gertrude Rhinelander Waldo House and St. James' Episcopal Church on Madison Avenue to the east. In addition, Central Park is one half block to the west.

== Architecture ==
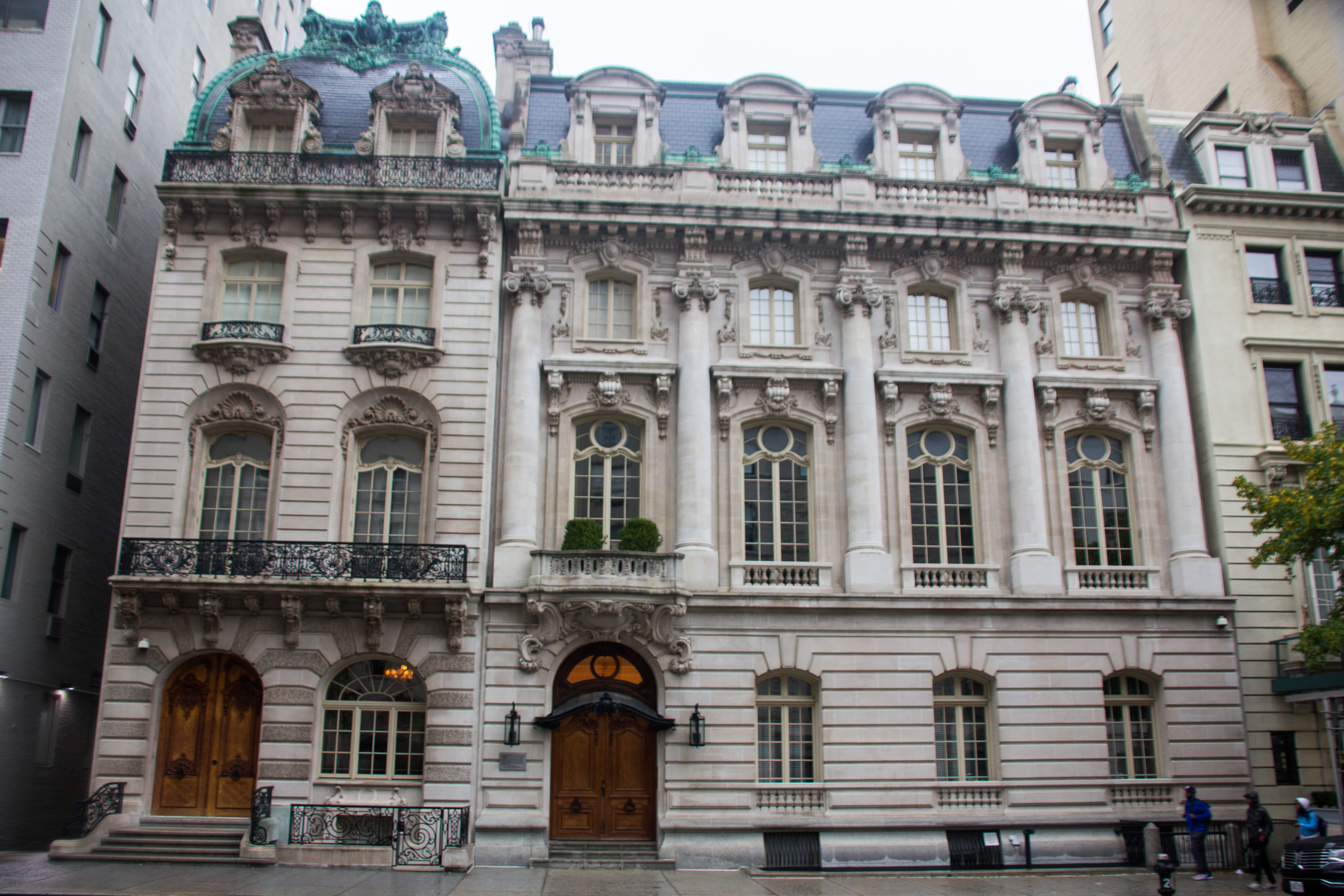
The main facade of the Sloane House (right) and Jennings House (left) on 72nd Street

The building was designed by Carrère and Hastings and is variously described as being in the French Beaux-Arts style or a "modern French" style. It was the third major building they designed in New York City (after the Edison Building and New York Evening Mail building). It is five stories high, although only four stories are visible from the street. The only visible elevation of the facade is on 72nd Street and is divided vertically into four bays. The facade is further divided horizontally into three sections, reminiscent of the base, shaft, and capital of a column.

=== Facade ===
The first story constitutes the base of the facade and is composed of rusticated limestone blocks, which are plain in design. The westernmost bay includes a round-arched entryway, which in turn is topped by a cartouche flanked by scrolled brackets. The doorway was originally shielded by a marquee. The rest of the first-story facade has segmentally-arched windows.

The facade of the second and third floors is interspersed with double-height engaged columns in the Ionic order. The facade is recessed behind the Ionic columns, giving the facade an appearance of increased depth. The second floor is designed like a piano nobile, the main floor of a palazzo. There is a balustrade with recessed, arched French windows behind it. The French windows are topped by circular oeil-de-boeuf transom windows, as well as grids of mullions that separate the windows into multiple glass panels. At the top of each French window is an elaborate keystone at the center of each bay, as well as scrolled brackets on either side. The third story is smaller and contains segmentally-arched windows. There are also cartouches above the third-floor windows, which are decorated with garlands and scrolls. The Ionic columns support a heavy cornice with dentils or modillions, which runs horizontally across the facade above the third floor.

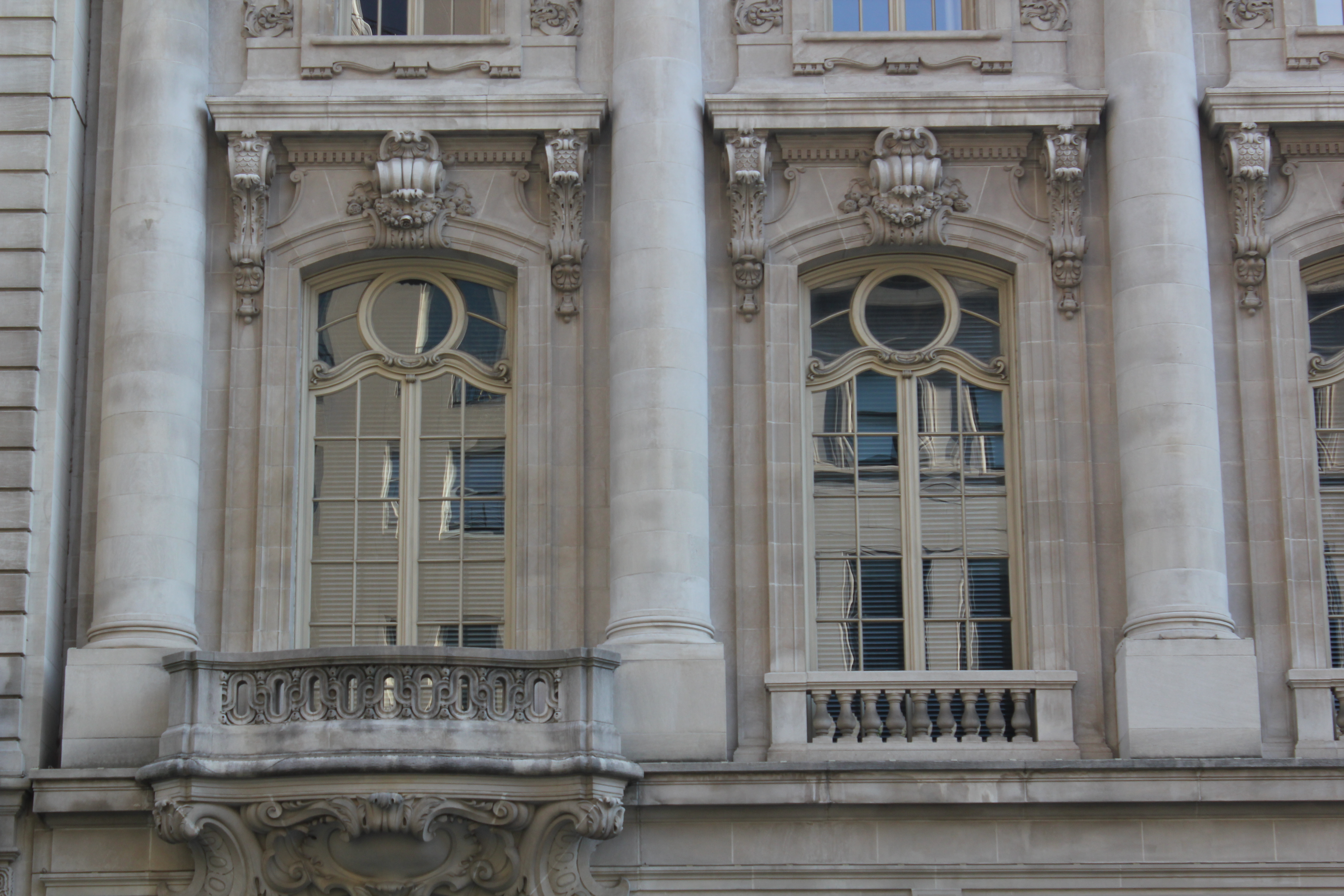
French windows on the second story

The fourth floor is within a mansard roof and is recessed behind a balustrade. On this story, there are four mansard windows, each corresponding to a bay on the first through third floors. The dormers protrude from the roof and are topped by flat-arched pediments. The use of flat-arched pediments on the fourth floor was intended to link it with the arched windows on the lower stories.

=== Features ===
The house originally spanned 25,363 square feet (2,356.3 m^{2}) and is decorated with details such as fireplaces and molded decorations. It was originally designed in the Louis XIV style, with rooms arranged around a "court of honor". The first floor has an entrance hall that is accessed via the court of honor. This hall measures 22 by 28 feet (6.7 by 8.5 m) and contains leaded glass windows, oak-and-iron doors from the entrance, a large fireplace, and a plaster ceiling with classical design details. A large curving staircase leads up to the second floor, with a metal balustrade, wall sconces, and various green-and-gold decorations. There is a reception room and study at the front of the first floor, as well as various staff rooms beside and at the rear of the courtyard.

At the front of the second floor is a drawing room measuring 25 by 26 feet (7.6 by 7.9 m) and a salon measuring 28 by 46 feet (8.5 by 14.0 m). The rear of the second floor originally had a conservatory room and a dining room. These were connected to the drawing room, salon, and main stairway via a loggia. A butler's room abutted the loggia to the east, and a stairway just south of the courtyard continued up to the top stories. The upper stories were designed in a French style and contained the family bedrooms and servants' quarters. Many of the rooms retained their original decorations in the 2000s, including doorknobs, chandeliers, and lamps.

A New York Times article from 1941 described the house as having 28 rooms, including eight bathrooms. A conservatory room was later installed behind the main second-floor rooms. In the late 20th century, the interior of the house retained most of its original design details. For example, when a sprinkler line was installed, it passed over one of the house's original drapery rods. When 9 East 72nd Street was combined with the neighboring 7 East 72nd Street in 2010, the combined houses included two levels of bedrooms, a swimming pool, and two top floors for the staff. There was also a 8,500-square-foot (790 m^{2}) terrace above the two houses. Observer cites the two houses as occupying a combined 45,000 square feet (4,200 m^{2}), though the New York City Department of City Planning cites the gross floor area as 42,380 square feet (3,937 m^{2}).

== History ==
9 East 72nd Street was originally constructed for Henry T. Sloane, whose father had founded the carpet firm W. & J. Sloane. Various members of the family married into other affluent New York City families in the late 19th century. These included Henry Sloane, who had, in 1880, married Jessie Ann Robbins, whose father was a partner in the wholesale drug firm of McKesson & Robbins. The Sloanes lived on 54th Street until the 1890s at a time when that part of Midtown Manhattan was filled with houses for the upper class.

=== Original residence ===
==== Sloane ownership ====
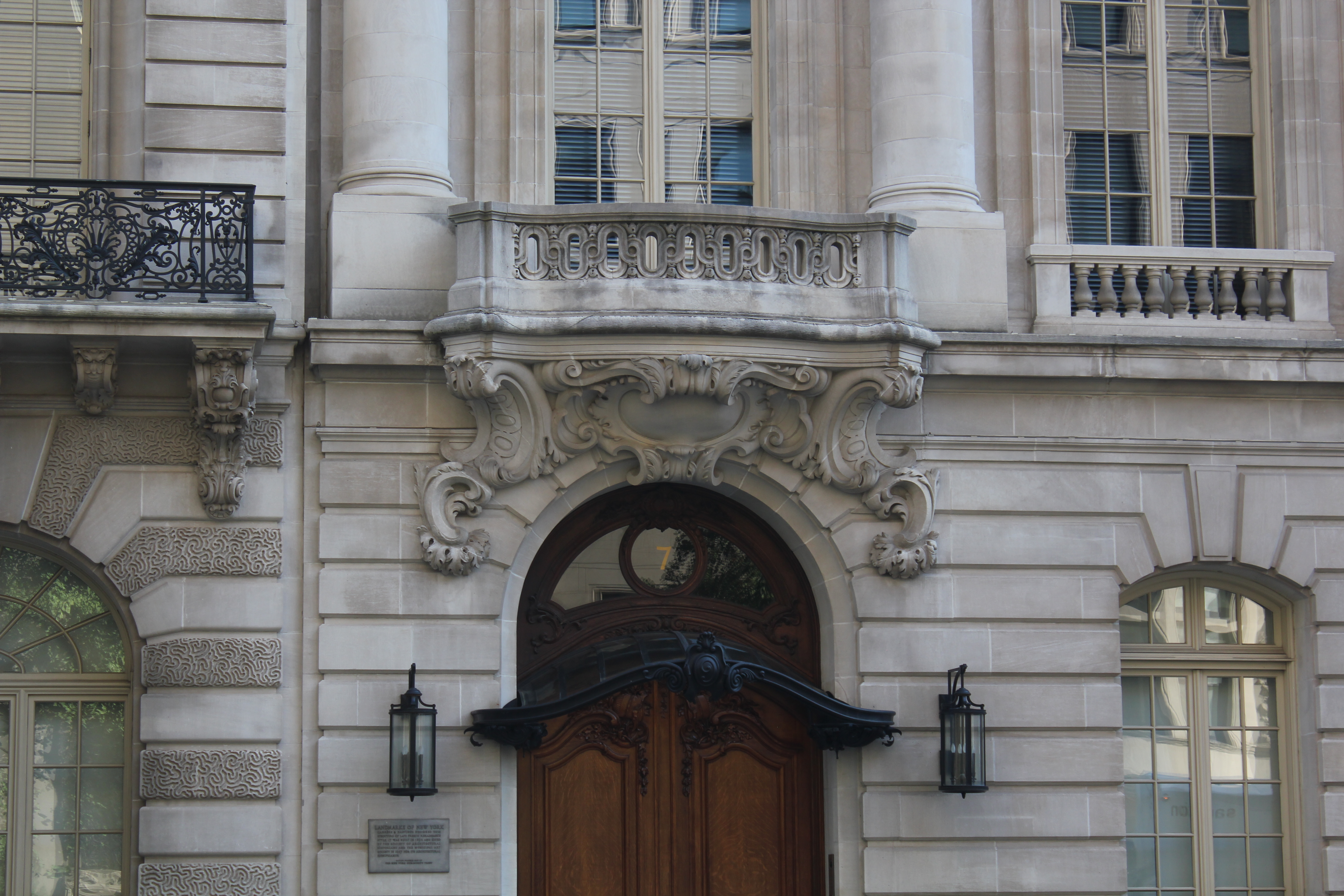
Entrance to the house

By the mid-1890s, numerous wealthy families had settled on 72nd Street. Henry Sloane initially may wanted to buy a lot at the corner of 72nd Street and Fifth Avenue, but that corner was already occupied. Instead, he bought a 54-foot-wide site at 9 East 72nd Street. Initially, Sloane wanted to hire both McKim, Mead & White and Richard Morris Hunt to design competing plans for the house. Hunt's wife said that Sloane had intended to combine elements of both architecture firms' plans, not knowing that doing so would be an ethical taboo for both firms. Sloane ultimately hired John M. Carrère and Thomas Hastings of the firm. Drawings of the house's interiors were publicized in The American Architect and Building News as early as December 1893. Plans for the house were not formally filed with the New York City Department of Buildings until August 1894, at which point the house was planned to cost $100,000. (Note: equivalent to $3,721,000 in 2025 (Note: 1634–1699: McCusker, J. J. (1997). How Much Is That in Real Money? A Historical Price Index for Use as a Deflator of Money Values in the Economy of the United States: Addenda et Corrigenda (PDF). American Antiquarian Society. 1700–1799: McCusker, J. J. (1992). How Much Is That in Real Money? A Historical Price Index for Use as a Deflator of Money Values in the Economy of the United States (PDF). American Antiquarian Society. 1800–present: Federal Reserve Bank of Minneapolis. "Consumer Price Index (estimate) 1800–".)) The house took two years to construct, and plans for the interior were modified during the construction process.

The house was recorded as being vacant in mid-1896, when a burglary prompted a police watchman to be posted outside the Sloanes' house, though $300,000 worth of furniture had been moved into the house by September 1896. During their first year at the house, the Sloanes hosted various housewarming events. One of the first events that the Sloanes hosted at the house was a dance party for more than 200 guests in January 1897, an event they also hosted the following year. The Sloanes lived in the house for only about three years, after Jessie began having an affair with Perry Belmont of the wealthy Belmont family. Henry deeded the house to Jessie in October 1898, and he attempted to win his wife back by giving her all matter of gifts. Following a protracted disagreement, Henry separated from his wife in December 1898 and moved to his sister's house on 57th Street. Jessie, who frequently communicated with friends via a messenger call box in the house, found that some of her messages were intercepted after the couple had separated.

The Sloanes formally received a divorce in April 1899, when Jessie married Perry Belmont and promptly moved to Washington, D.C. Under the terms of the divorce, Jessie gave up the 72nd Street residence and agreed not to visit her two daughters until they turned 21 years old. If Henry did not agree to buy back the house, it was to be sold, with their two daughters sharing the profits. Henry agreed to buy the house that May, with the condition that he was to pay off about $64,000 worth of Jessie's personal debts. (Note: equivalent to $2,477,000 in 2025) At the time, the house was valued at $450,000. (Note: equivalent to $17,415,000 in 2025) After Henry bought back the house, he did not live there. Instead, in February 1900, Sloane leased the house to the publisher Joseph Pulitzer, who was living in the Hotel Netherland because his house at 55th Street had burned down. Pulitzer agreed to pay $17,500 a year in rent. (Note: equivalent to $677,000 in 2025) for a lease that expired in May 1901. Shortly after his family moved to 9 East 72nd Street, Pulitzer bought several lots one block north on 73rd Street for his permanent residence—the Joseph Pulitzer House. The 1900 United States census shows that Pulitzer's household consisted of six people and that he employed another 17 servants.

==== Subsequent ownership ====
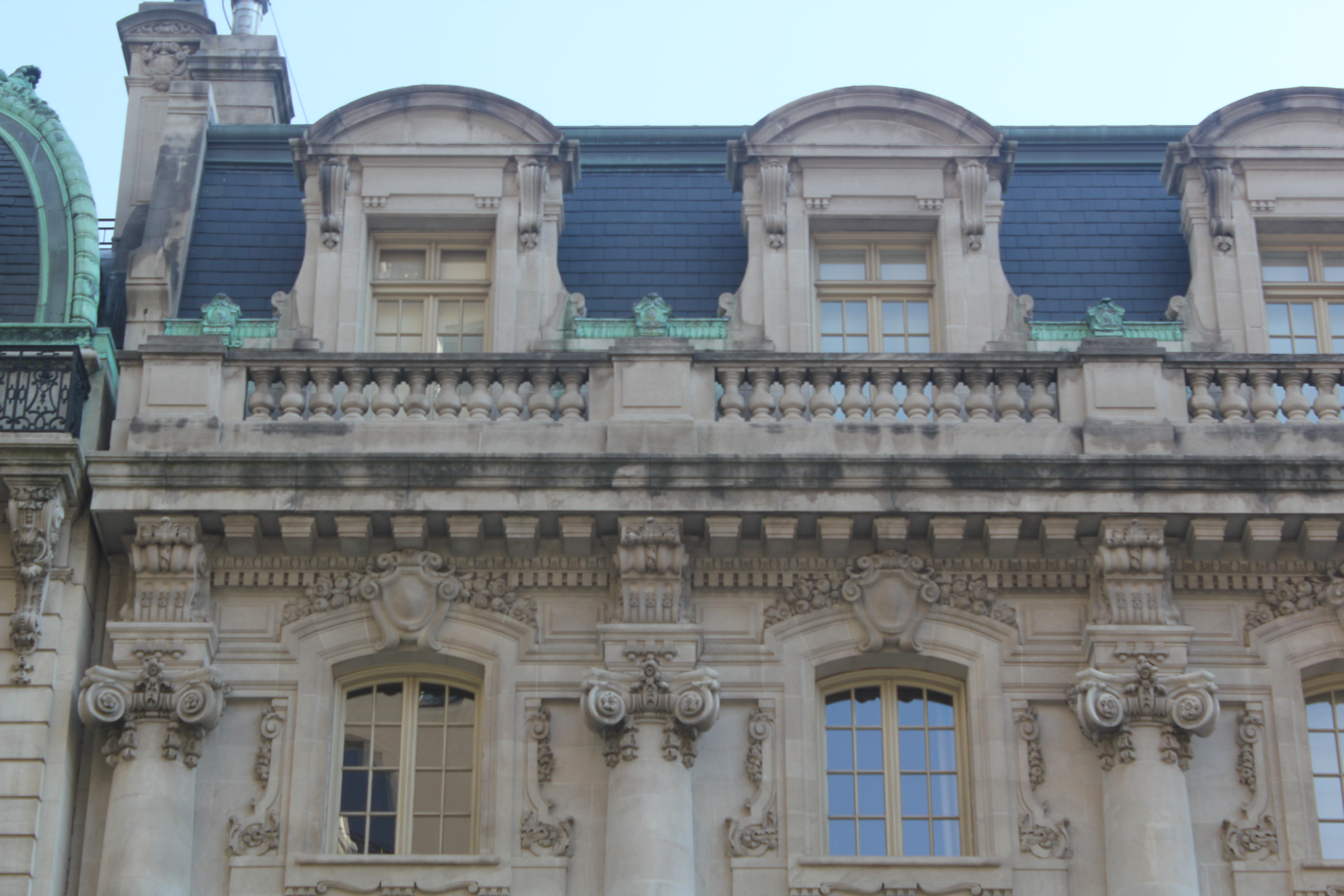
Third and fourth floors

In February 1901, the house was sold to James A. Stillman, the president of National City Bank of New York; the house was valued at $450,000. (Note: equivalent to $17,415,000 in 2025) At the time, Stillman also owned property at 17 and 19 East 72nd Street to the east. as well as property on the northeast corner of Fifth Avenue and 72nd Street to the west. Stillman had planned to construct a mansion on the latter corner, to be designed by McKim, Mead & White, but the mansion was never built, and that site remained vacant. By 1905, Stillman was recorded as having shifted his primary residence out of New York City, though he continued to live at 9 East 72nd Street. Stillman had nine servants at the house, including a chef whose cooking he reviewed every night. The few visitors Stillman invited had a largely negative impression of him, and whenever he invited family members over, he forced them to sit in silence for hours. After retiring from National City Bank in 1909, Stillman spent most of his time in Paris. Although he hosted events such as a reception for his son's wedding in 1911, The Buffalo News described the house the next year as one of several empty mansions in New York City.

Stillman retained the house until he died of heart disease there in March 1918. The carpet manufacturer and former U.S. representative John Sanford leased the house for a short time before buying it in April 1919 at an estimated value of $500,000. (Note: equivalent to $9,285,000 in 2025) The Sanfords hosted events such as lecture-musicals, a dinner honoring their son Stephen, and debutante balls for their daughters Sarah and Gertrude. Sanford's wife Ethel lived at the house until her death in 1924. In the late 1920s, the Sanfords continued to host events at their house, such as dinners and dances. Stephen Sanford was recorded as living at the house until he married the actress Mary Duncan in 1933, as did Sarah until her own marriage in 1937. John Sanford ultimately died in September 1939. By that time, many mansions in the neighborhood were being demolished or converted to non-residential uses, as millionaires no longer resided in these mansions.

The house was purchased by an unnamed client of Douglas Elliman in 1941. Mary J. Riker was recorded as having owned the house after Sanford; she bought the house to protect her residence at 7 East 72nd Street. In early 1945, Riker successfully petitioned to have the house's value reduced by 62 percent for tax purposes. Riker sold the house to Harold C. Mathews Jr. and Archibald Dudgeon that June. The New York Herald Tribune reported in December 1946 that Mathews and Dudgeon transferred ownership of the house in December 1946 at an estimated value of $200,000, (Note: equivalent to $3,302,000 in 2025) but the Herald Tribune and The New York Times both record Harold Churchill Mathews as having owned the house through the next year. In any case, Mrs. Sterling Boos bought the house from Mathews in September 1947 as a sanctuary for the "I AM" Activity religious movement; at the time, the house was valued at $185,000. (Note: equivalent to $2,667,000 in 2025) After Boos's acquisition, the house was occupied by the Sanctuary of the Master's Presence; the interiors remained mostly unchanged even after its conversion to religious use. The building also hosted events such as the 1959 wedding of Boos's daughter Marilyn.

=== Use as school ===
In April 1964, the Lycée Français de New York, a French-language school, purchased 7 and 9 East 72nd Street from the Boos family for a combined $850,000. (Note: equivalent to $8,824,000 in 2025) The school took out a $815,275 mortgage from Massachusetts Mutual, (Note: equivalent to $8,463,000 in 2025) which covered both the 72nd Street houses and Lycée Français's original building at 3 East 95th Street. At the time, the school had already operated 7 East 72nd Street for several years. and Paul L. Wood and Reginald E. Marsh were hired to renovate 9 East 72nd Street as an annex for the school. The Municipal Art Society had installed a historic-landmark plaque on the house's facade by that point. Lycée Français formally opened its classrooms at 9 East 72nd Street on September 24, 1964; the school hosted classes in one of the houses' old ballrooms due to a lack of space.

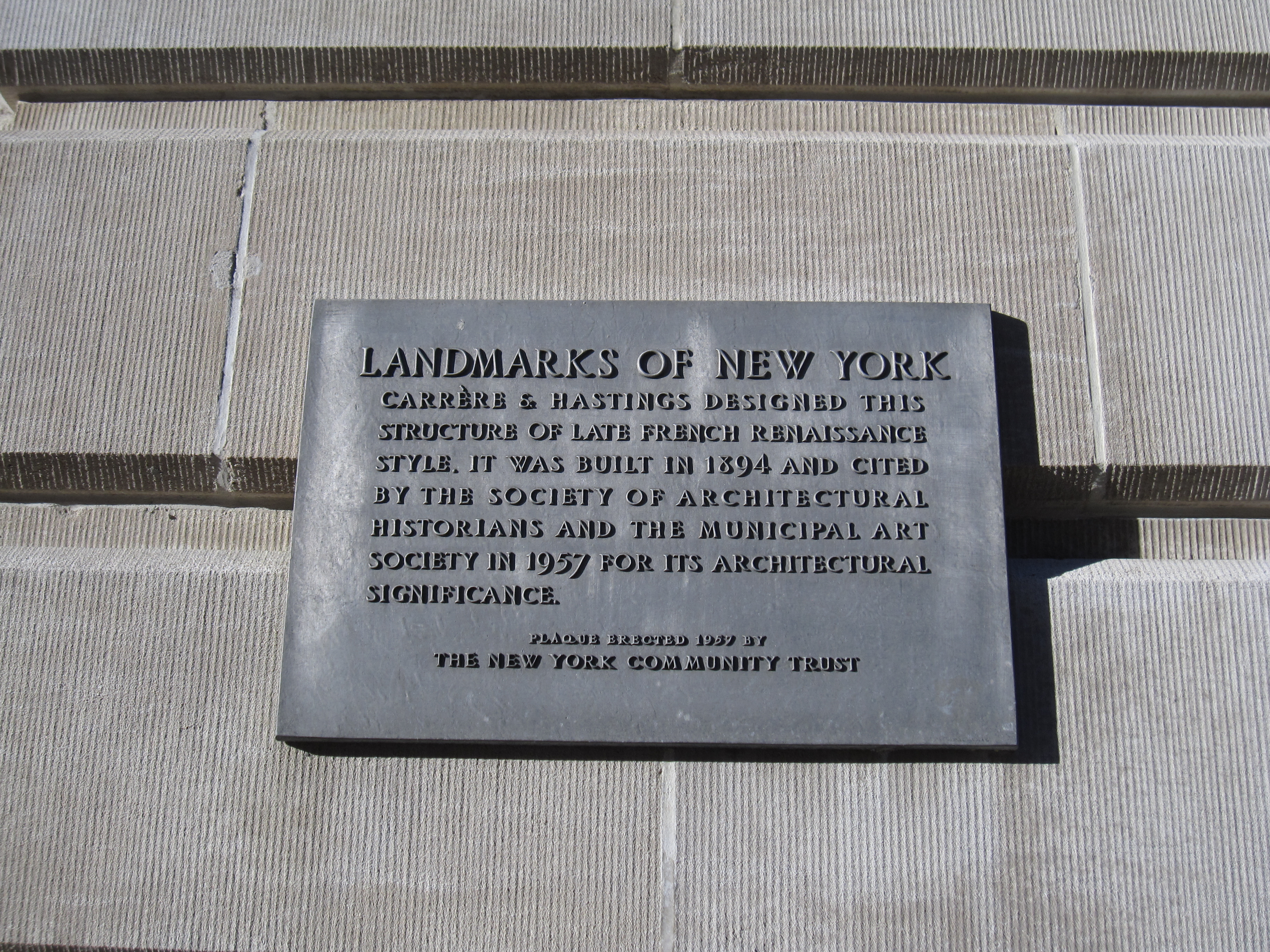
Historical plaque

The school made relatively few alterations to the two houses over the years. The New York City Landmarks Preservation Commission considered designating 7 and 9 East 72nd Street as city landmarks in 1976 and granted the designations in January 1977, despite the school's opposition to either designation. By the late 1970s, the houses at 7 and 9 East 72nd Street contained Lycée Français's kindergarten through fourth-grade classes. Lycée Français bought 12 East 73rd Street, a five-bedroom mansion behind the two 72nd Street houses, for $4.3 million in 1994. The 73rd Street mansion was subsequently linked to the existing 72nd Street houses.

After Lycée Français developed a new building on York Avenue in the 2000s, the school originally considered keeping the six townhouses that it owned, including the houses at 7 and 9 East 72nd Street. However, they were all protected as city landmarks, making it difficult to modify any of the houses without permission from the city government. Instead, the school began looking to sell the six townhouses in August 2000 at a combined price of $100 million. Initially, Lycée Français hired Massey Knakal to market the buildings; school officials refused an offer to buy the buildings for $43 million. When Lycée Français hired the Corcoran Group as the new broker the next year, it sought $51 million for the two 72nd Street houses, including $30 million for 9 East 72nd Street. By early 2001, the school had reduced its asking price for 9 East 72nd Street to $25 million. Dozens of buyers expressed interest in the house, of which real estate broker Barbara Corcoran estimated that half wanted to convert it into a single-family home. The 72nd Street houses remained unsold for over two years because of a decline in New York City real estate following the September 11 attacks.

=== Qatari residence ===
Although an appraiser said in mid-2002 that the two buildings at 7 and 9 East 72nd Street could be sold for $25 million each, they were ultimately sold for a combined $26 million. The purchaser of the buildings was Hamad bin Khalifa Al Thani, then the Emir of Qatar, who reportedly beat out the developer Donald Trump and an unknown bidder when he agreed to acquire the properties in August 2002. The sale was finalized the next year. The Qatari government began combining the two buildings into a single house in 2004. The project was designed by Thornton Tomasetti and took six years.

The renovations of both buildings had been completed by 2010. The combined mansion at 7–9 East 72nd Street covered 45,000 square feet (4,200 m^{2}), making it New York City's largest single-family house. It also became one of several dozen properties that the Qatari government owned in New York City. Qatari Sheikha Al-Mayassa bint Hamad Al Thani used the houses as her New York City residence, displaying her art collection across numerous rooms. The state of Qatar bought the adjacent 12 East 73rd Street in 2017 to house the servants who were employed at 7–9 East 72nd Street.

== Reception ==
Upon the house's completion, the New-York Tribune called the residence "one of the most spacious and magnificent in New York", and The New York Times described the house as "one of the handsomest of the newer uptown residences". In 1900, Architectural Annual magazine described 7 and 9 East 72nd Street as "Enigmas: Hotels particuliers a New York – but not the French Quarter" in a picture caption. A writer for The New York Times described the house in 1974 as "perhaps the finest of the Gallic limestones" to be developed around the Upper East Side's millionaire's row. When the building was placed for sale in 2000, a reporter for the same paper said the building was "regarded by architects as one of the finest Beaux-Arts town houses in the city". Christopher Gray of The New York Times wrote in 2011 that the house's design was "ultra-French" but was beaten out by the neighboring 7 East 72nd Street.

== See also ==
- List of New York City Designated Landmarks in Manhattan from 59th to 110th Streets
