= Oliver Gould Jennings House =

Building in Manhattan, New York

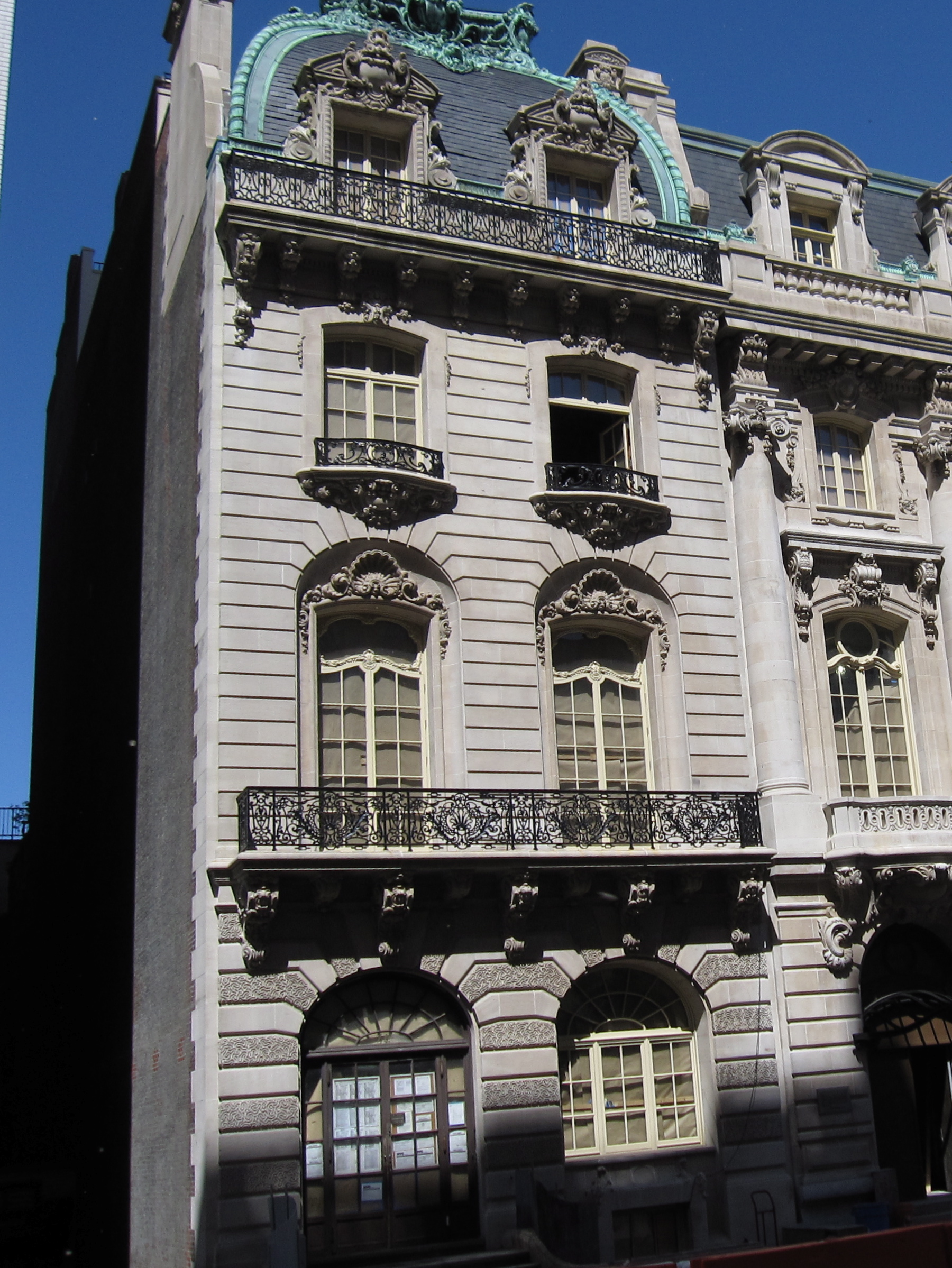
- The main facade on 72nd Street
- Interactive map of the Oliver Gould Jennings House area
- Alternative names: 7 East 72nd Street

General information
- Type: Mansion
- Architectural style: Beaux-Arts
- Location: 7 East 72nd Street, New York, NY 10021, United States
- Coordinates: 40°46′20″N 73°57′58″W
- Construction started: 1898
- Completed: 1899
- Client: Henry T. Sloane
- Owner: Government of Qatar

Technical details
- Floor count: 4
- Floor area: 45,000 square feet (4,200 m^{2}) (with 9 East 72nd Street)

Design and construction
- Architects: Ernest Flagg and Walter B. Chambers

The Oliver Gould Jennings House is a mansion at 7 East 72nd Street on the Upper East Side of Manhattan in New York City. It is along 72nd Street's northern sidewalk between Fifth Avenue and Madison Avenue. The four-story building was designed by Ernest Flagg and Walter B. Chambers and was built in 1898. The house, along with the neighboring structure at 9 East 72nd Street, has been owned since 2002 by the government of Qatar, which has combined the two buildings into a single residence.

The facade is divided vertically into two bays and is made of rusticated blocks of limestone, rising four stories from the street. It includes an arched entrance at the first story, French windows opening onto a balcony at the second story, and a mansard roof on the fourth story. The house originally spanned 18,256 square feet (1,696.0 m^{2}), with interiors designed in a variety of styles. The interior spaces included a ground-floor dining room and reception room; a second-floor library and drawing room; and bedrooms on the upper stories. After 7 and 9 East 72nd Street were combined, the residence included a swimming pool and a roof terrace.

The house was constructed for Oliver Gould Jennings between 1898 and 1899. Jennings lived there until 1914, when it was resold several times. It was used as a temporary location of the Solomon R. Guggenheim Museum from 1956 to 1959. In 1960, it became part of the Lycée Français de New York, which also came to occupy 9 East 72nd Street. The house became a New York City designated landmark in 1977. The school vacated 7 and 9 East 72nd Street in 2002, when they were sold to Hamad bin Khalifa Al Thani, the Emir of Qatar. After the Qatari government finished renovating and combining the buildings in 2010, the two structures comprised New York City's largest single-family residence.

== Site ==
The former Oliver Gould Jennings House is at 7 East 72nd Street, along the northern side of 72nd Street between Fifth Avenue and Madison Avenue, on the Upper East Side of Manhattan in New York City. The house originally had a north–south depth of 102 feet (31 m); sources disagree on whether the frontage on 72nd Street was 25 feet (7.6 m) or 28 feet (8.5 m). Since 2010, the house has been connected with the former Henry T. Sloane House at 9 East 72nd Street, immediately to the east, forming a single residence. The two houses collectively occupy a single rectangular land lot of 8,923 square feet (829.0 m^{2}), with a frontage of 87.33 feet (26.62 m) and a north–south depth of 102.17 feet (31.14 m). Notable buildings nearby include the Pulitzer Mansion on the block to the north; 907 Fifth Avenue and 9 East 71st Street on the block to the south; and the Gertrude Rhinelander Waldo House and St. James' Episcopal Church on Madison Avenue to the east. In addition, Central Park is one half block to the west.

== Architecture ==
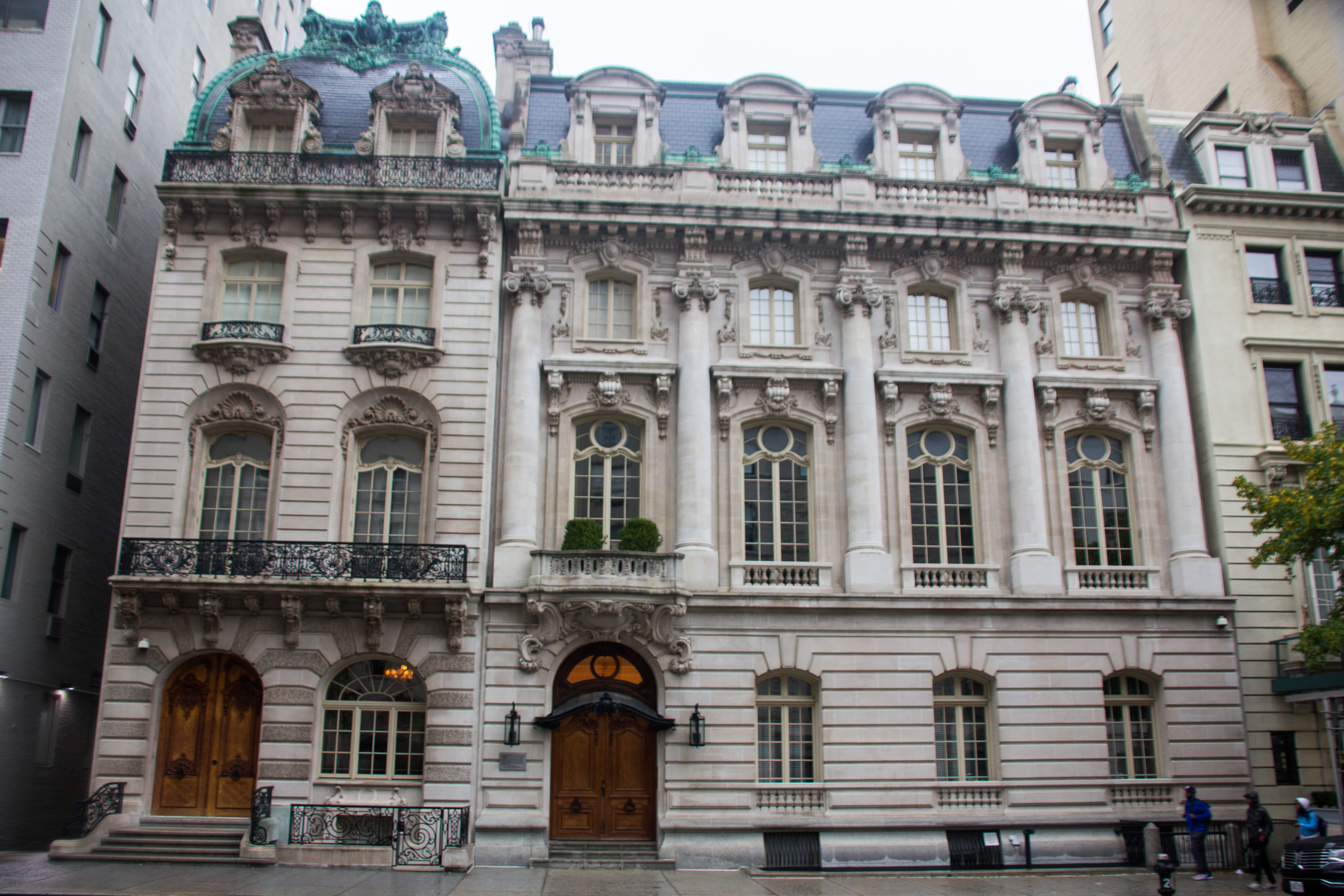
The main facade of the Jennings House (left) and Sloane House (right) on 72nd Street

The building was designed by Ernest Flagg and Walter B. Chambers of the firm of Flagg and Chambers. It was constructed in a modern French Beaux-Arts style. The facade was intended to complement the design of Henry T. Sloane's house at 9 East 72nd Street. The architects accomplished this by using Indiana limestone, a similar material to the stone used on Sloane's home, and by matching the floor heights of Jennings's house to those of Sloane's.

=== Facade ===
The facade rises four stories above 72nd Street and is topped by a mansard roof. The only visible elevation of the facade, on 72nd Street, is divided vertically into two bays. On the first story, the facade is rusticated and contains smooth-faced horizontal bands alternating with vermiculated horizontal bands. There is a carved wooden doorway in the left bay of the house. Within the right bay, there is a wide archway with a window. Carved brackets, above the first-floor door and window, support a balcony on the second floor.

On the second floor, the facade is also rusticated but is made entirely of smooth limestone. The second-story French doors open onto a balcony with an elaborate iron balustrade. At the top of the second-story windows are scallop designs, which are recessed into the facade. There are corbels with cartouches below either of the third-story window sills. The windows on the third story are placed within segmentally-arched openings, and there are ornate iron window guards in front of the windows. Above the third-story windows is a cornice with brackets, as well as an iron railing above the cornice, which extends across the house. The fourth story is within a convex mansard roof, which is made of copper and slate. There are two dormer windows on the roof, each with an elaborate copper cresting and an ornate frame. Above each dormer window is a segmentally-arched pediment with carved cartouches, and there are also volutes flanking each of the dormer windows.

=== Features ===
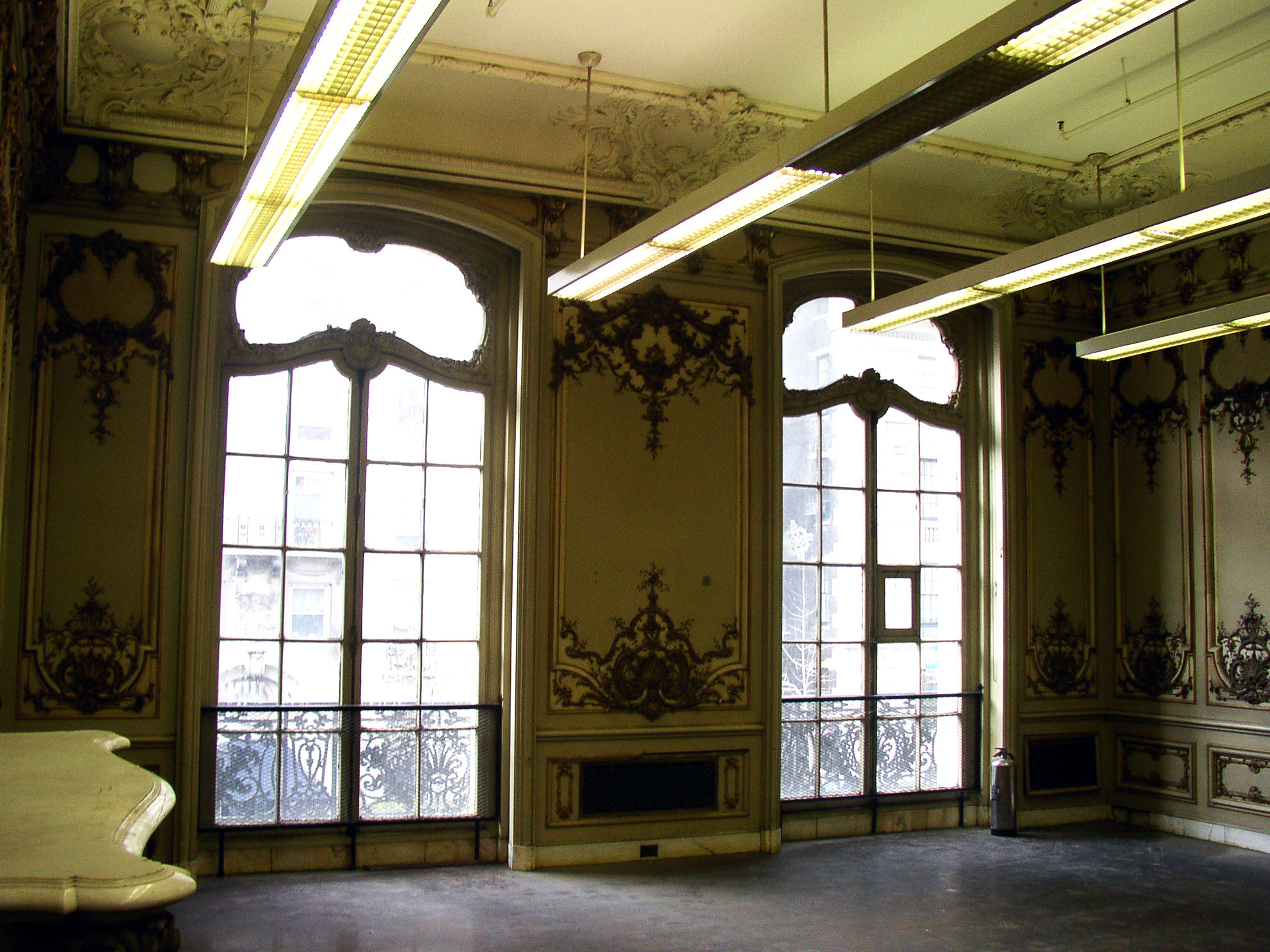
Interior before renovation in 2007

The house internally contains five levels with a total of 18,256 square feet (1,696.0 m^{2}). It is decorated with details such as fireplaces and molded decorations. The house was intended to be fireproof; as such, kalamein-iron doors and windows were used throughout the house.

The ground-level entrance led to a vestibule and entrance hall with stone walls and marble floors. The stairs, walls, fireplace, and cornice of the entrance hall were all of carved Caen stone, while the floor was made of marble with inlaid borders in different colors. There was also a reception room at the front of the ground story, with wooden paneling and a plaster ceiling. The reception room was to the east of the entrance, adjoining a powder room. A stair in the Louis XV style led from the eastern side of the house up to the second floor; the railings on the stairs were of wrought iron. In the rear of the ground story was a dining room, with decorations in the Louis XIV style, in addition to an adjoining pantry.

The primary rooms were placed on the second floor, one story above ground. At the front of the house was a drawing room measuring 25 by 31 feet (7.6 by 9.4 m) across, while at the rear of the house was a library measuring 20 by 24 feet (6.1 by 7.3 m) long. The drawing room was in the French rococo style, and the library was in the Louis XVI style with half-height bookcases and a marble fireplace. The drawing room and library were connected by a stair hall and gallery. When 7 East 72nd Street was combined with the neighboring 9 East 72nd Street in 2010, the combined houses included two levels of bedrooms, a swimming pool, and two top floors for the staff. There was also a 8,500-square-foot (790 m^{2}) terrace above the two houses. The New York Observer cites the two houses as occupying a combined 45,000 square feet (4,200 m^{2}), though the New York City Department of City Planning cites the gross floor area as 42,380 square feet (3,937 m^{2}).

== History ==
7 East 72nd Street was originally constructed for Oliver Gould Jennings, who served on the boards of Bethlehem Steel, McKesson & Robbins, and National Fuel Gas. Jennings's father Oliver Burr Jennings was one of the original stockholders of Standard Oil, one of the world's largest oil businesses, and had left his son $1.3 million upon his death in 1893. The younger Jennings was married to Mary Dows Brewster, the daughter of his father's business partner Benjamin Brewster. When Benjamin Brewster died in 1897, he left Mary a large inheritance.

=== Original residence ===
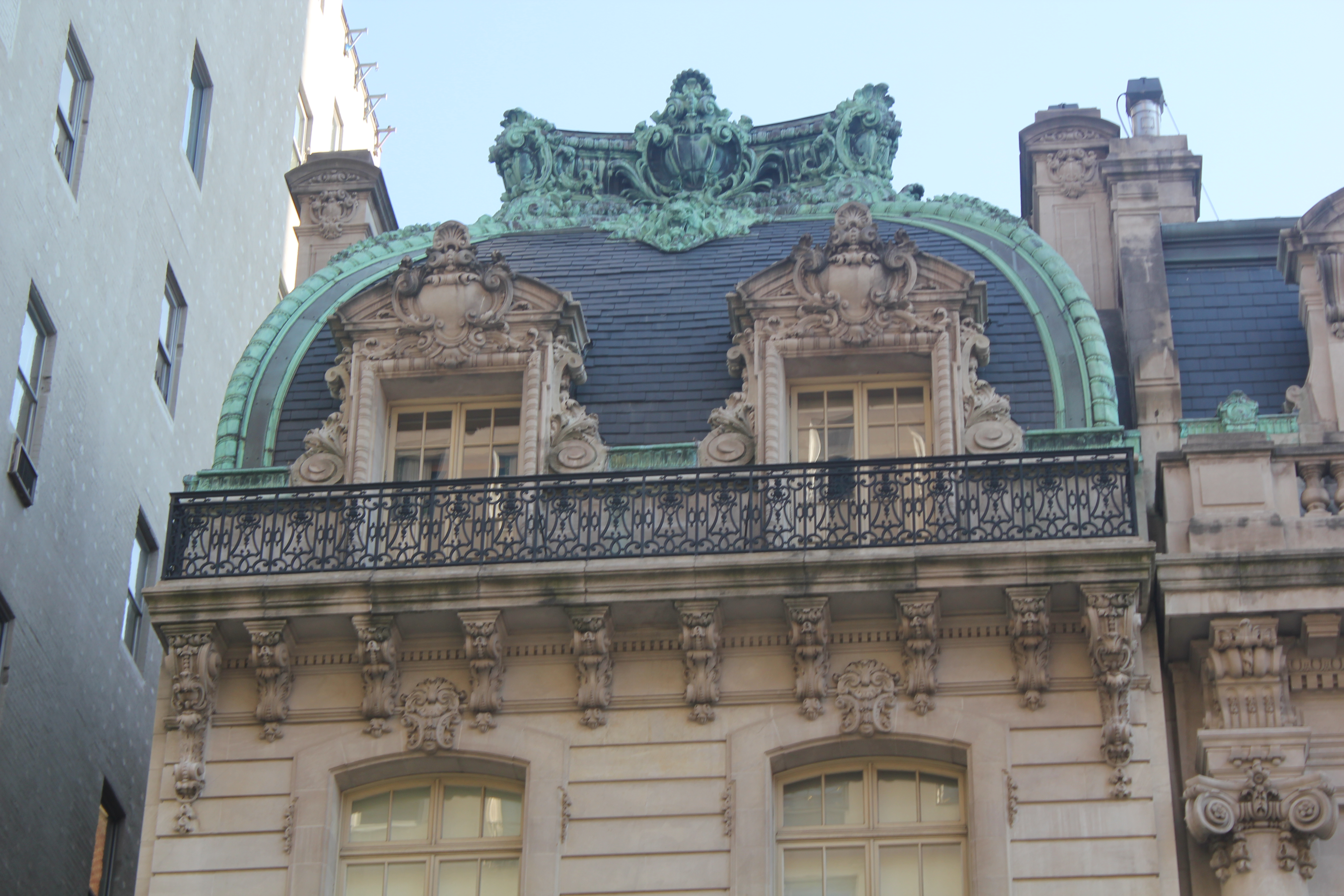
Mansard roof

By the mid-1890s, numerous wealthy families had settled on 72nd Street, including the Jennings family. In March 1898, the Jennings family bought a plot on the north side of 72nd Street, east of Fifth Avenue, from the family of Collis P. Huntington for between $75,000 and $80,000. (Note: Equivalent to between $2,903,000 and $3,096,000 in 2025 (Note: 1634–1699: McCusker, J. J. (1997). How Much Is That in Real Money? A Historical Price Index for Use as a Deflator of Money Values in the Economy of the United States: Addenda et Corrigenda (PDF). American Antiquarian Society. 1700–1799: McCusker, J. J. (1992). How Much Is That in Real Money? A Historical Price Index for Use as a Deflator of Money Values in the Economy of the United States (PDF). American Antiquarian Society. 1800–present: Federal Reserve Bank of Minneapolis. "Consumer Price Index (estimate) 1800–".)) Jennings was one of several people to buy land on the east side of Fifth Avenue from 72nd to 73rd Street in the late 1890s. Flagg and Chambers were hired to design the house, while Sloane & Moller were hired as the house's general contractors. The architects intentionally designed the facade so it harmonized with the facade of Henry T. Sloane's adjacent mansion at 9 East 72nd Street. The house was completed in 1899, and the New-York Tribune reported at the end of November that the house was ready for their occupancy. The Jennings family hosted events such as dinners in their house. In addition to their 72nd Street residence, the Jenningses had a country estate named Mailands in Fairfield, Connecticut.

With the growing traffic on 72nd Street, the Jennings family no longer wished to live on that street. Jennings agreed in April 1914 to sell his house to W. Emlen Roosevelt's Four West Fifty-seventh Street Company. Media sources record the building as having been transferred to Frank Schlitt, who promptly gave it to Roosevelt. Jennings bought an empty site at 882 Fifth Avenue, where he developed a new house. He continued to live at 7 East 72nd Street for at least another year, and the Real Estate Record reported at the end of 1915 that the new house was nearly completed. At some point, ownership of the house reverted to Jennings, who sold it in October 1917 to Sumner Gerard, a businessman whose brother James W. Gerard was a former U.S. ambassador. The house was offered as partial payment for a site that Gerard owned on the southwest corner of Fifth Avenue and 96th Street. When the house was transferred to Gerard, it was valued at $325,000. (Note: equivalent to $8,167,000 in 2025)

Among the events the Gerard family hosted in their house were a bridge tournament to raise funds for charity, as well as a meeting for the Woodrow Wilson Foundation. The Gerard family lived at the house for a relatively short time; by January 1923, the New-York Tribune reported that the house had been sold yet again. The house was then occupied by Henry I. Riker, his wife, and their children. Riker himself is recorded as having lived there until his death in November 1927. The Rikers' daughter Mary moved out following her marriage in 1930, while their son John had moved out by the time he got married in 1932. Henry's widow Mary was living at the house by herself by the 1940s, when she bought the neighboring residence at 9 East 72nd Street to protect the value of her house.

=== Institutional use ===
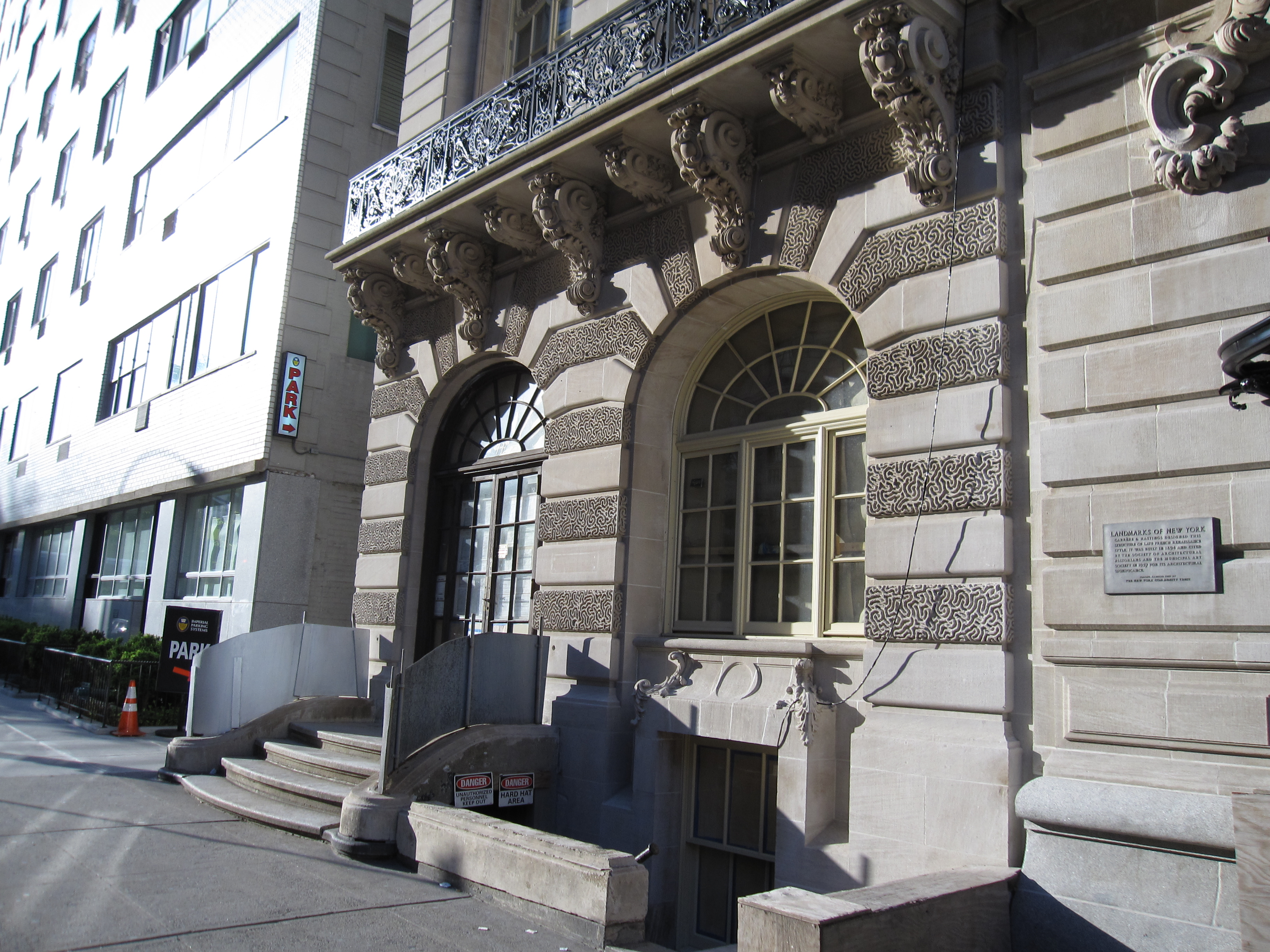
Main entrance

In the mid-20th century, the house briefly hosted the Danish mission to the United Nations. The Solomon R. Guggenheim Museum then rented space at the house in May 1956, in preparation for the construction of the museum's permanent building on Fifth Avenue. Initially, the house was used only as storage space and offices, rather than an exhibition space. The house hosted exhibits during the late 1950s, such as showcases of items from the museum's collection; works by Guggenheim International Award winners; works from contemporary European painters; and artwork by Marcel Duchamp and his older brothers Raymond and Jacques. The Guggenheim moved out of the house in 1959, when the museum's permanent building opened.

The Lycée Français de New York, a French-language school, leased 7 East 72nd Street from Sterling J. Boos in August 1960. Lycée Français initially housed its kindergarten and its secondary school in the building. In April 1964, Lycée Français purchased 7 and 9 East 72nd Street from the Boos family for a combined $850,000. (Note: equivalent to $8,824,000 in 2025) The school took out a $815,275 mortgage from Massachusetts Mutual, (Note: equivalent to $8,463,000 in 2025) which covered both the 72nd Street houses and Lycée Français's original building at 3 East 95th Street. Although the expansion at 9 East 72nd Street opened on September 24, 1964, the school hosted classes in one of the houses' old ballrooms due to a lack of space.

The school made relatively few alterations to the two houses over the years. The New York City Landmarks Preservation Commission considered designating 7 and 9 East 72nd Street as city landmarks in 1976 and granted the designations in January 1977, despite the school's opposition to either designation. By the late 1970s, the houses at 7 and 9 East 72nd Street contained Lycée Français's kindergarten through fourth-grade classes. Lycée Français bought 12 East 73rd Street, a five-bedroom mansion behind the two 72nd Street houses, for $4.3 million in 1994. The 73rd Street mansion was subsequently linked to the existing 72nd Street houses.

After Lycée Français developed a new building on York Avenue in the 2000s, the school originally considered keeping the six townhouses that it owned, including the houses at 7 and 9 East 72nd Street. However, they were all protected as city landmarks, making it difficult to modify any of the houses without permission from the city government. Instead, the school began looking to sell the six townhouses in August 2000 at a combined price of $100 million. Initially, Lycée Français hired Massey Knakal to market the buildings; school officials refused an offer to buy the buildings for $43 million. When Lycée Français hired the Corcoran Group as the new broker the next year, it sought $51 million for the two 72nd Street houses, including $21 million for 7 East 72nd Street. The 72nd Street houses remained unsold for over two years because of a decline in New York City real estate following the September 11 attacks.

=== Qatari residence ===
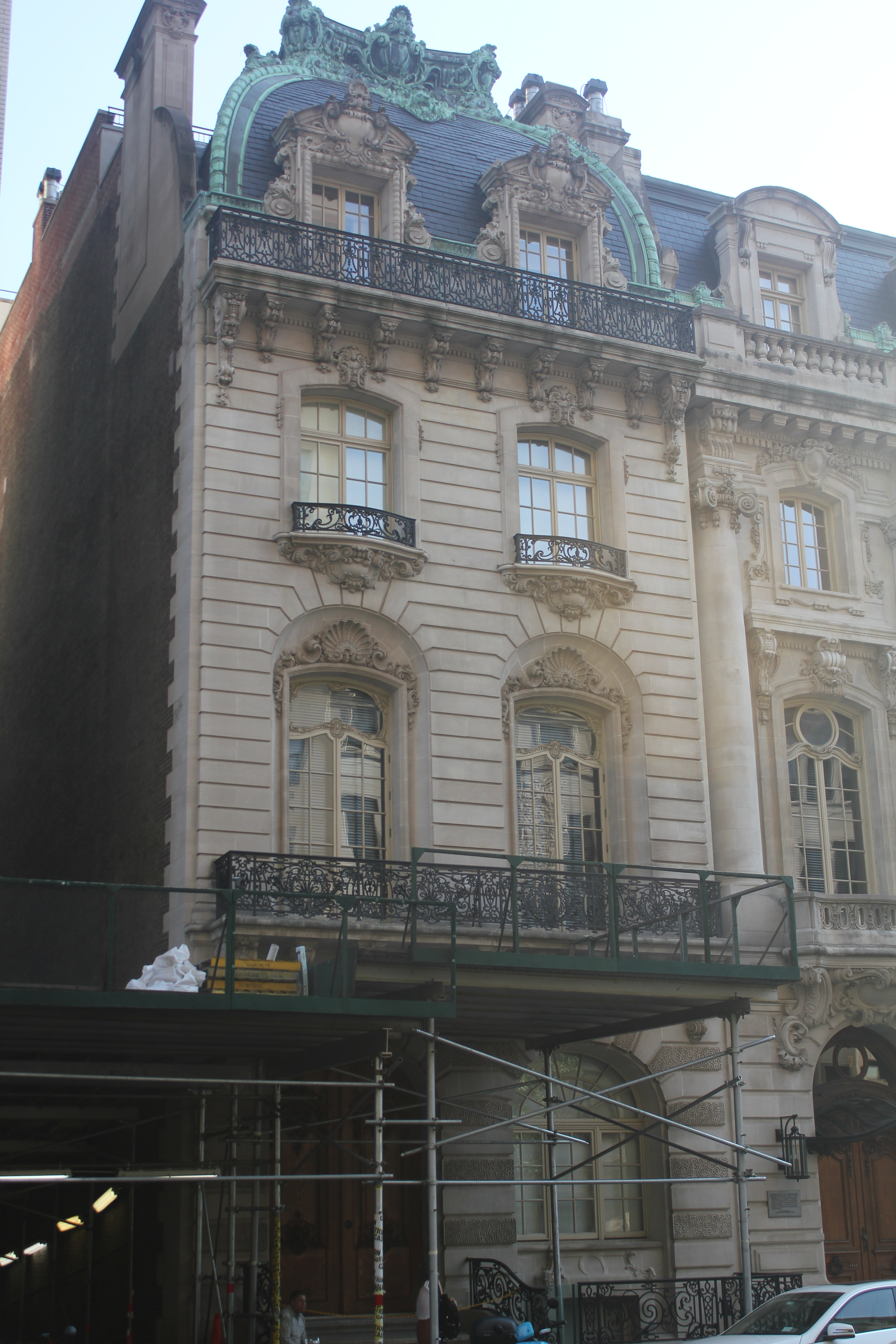
The facade seen from across 72nd Street

Although an appraiser said in mid-2002 that the two buildings at 7 and 9 East 72nd Street could be sold for $25 million each, they were ultimately sold for a combined $26 million. The purchaser of the buildings was Hamad bin Khalifa Al Thani, then the Emir of Qatar, who reportedly beat out the developer Donald Trump and an unknown bidder when he agreed to acquire the properties in August 2002. The sale was finalized the next year. The Qatari government began combining the two buildings into a single house in 2004. The project was designed by Thornton Tomasetti and took six years.

The renovations of both buildings had been completed by 2010. The combined mansion at 7–9 East 72nd Street covered 45,000 square feet (4,200 m^{2}), making it New York City's largest single-family house. It also became one of several dozen properties that the Qatari government owned in New York City. Qatari Sheikha Al-Mayassa bint Hamad Al Thani used the houses as her New York City residence, displaying her art collection across numerous rooms. The state of Qatar bought the adjacent 12 East 73rd Street in 2017 to house the servants who were employed at 7–9 East 72nd Street.

== Reception ==
In 1900, Architectural Annual magazine described 7 and 9 East 72nd Street as "Enigmas: Hotels particuliers a New York – but not the French Quarter" in a picture caption. The New-York Tribune said that "it was natural" for Flagg and Chambers to design 7 East 72nd Street in a similar style to 9 East 72nd Street and that "the proximity of these two buildings raises some lively thoughts about what the force of example may bring us to". Christopher Gray of The New York Times wrote in 2011 that the house's design defined "the Beaux-Arts movement sweeping over New York at the turn of the century".

== See also ==
- List of New York City Designated Landmarks in Manhattan from 59th to 110th Streets
