= Henry T. Sloane =

American businessman (1845–1937)

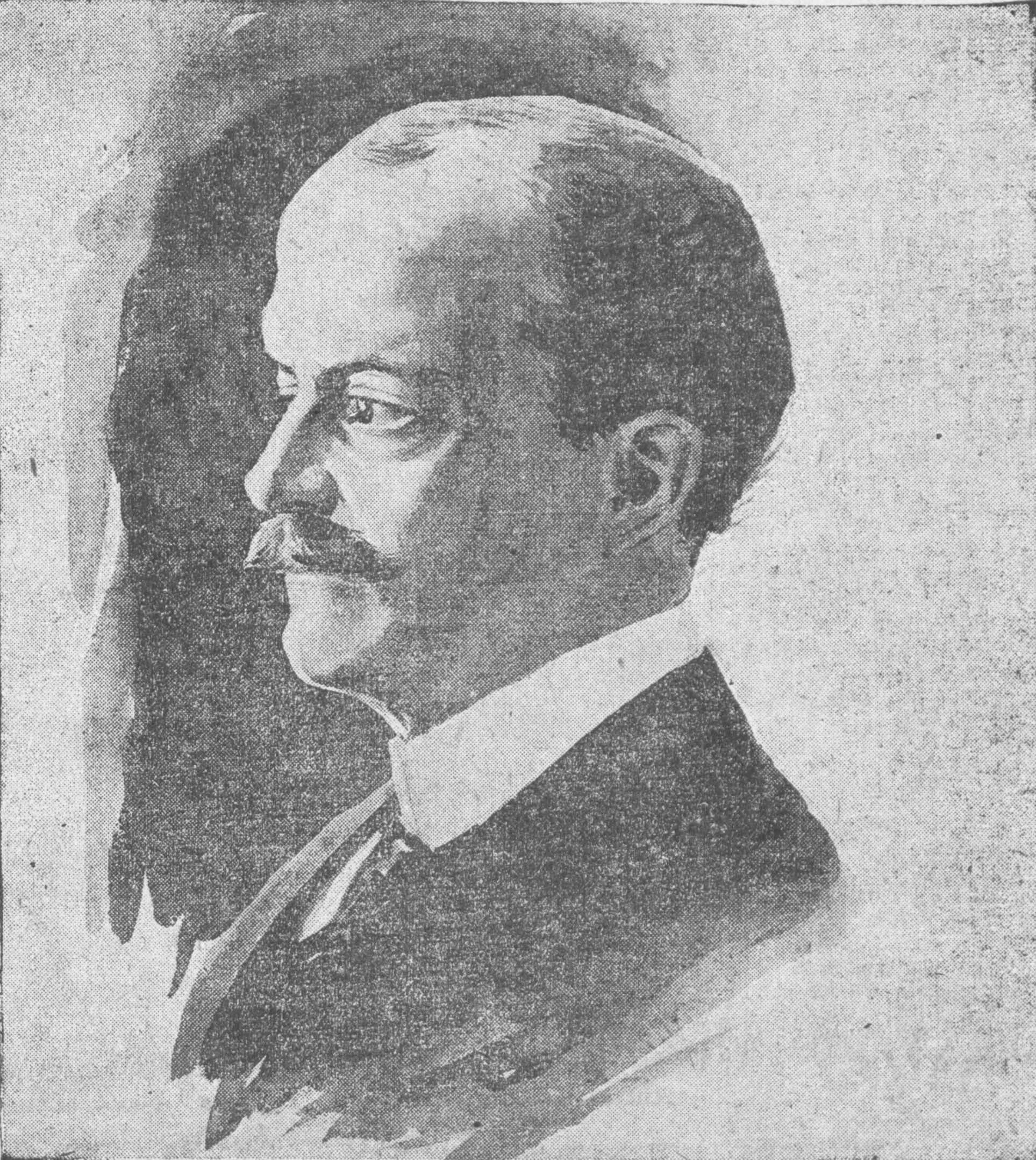
- Born: December 1, 1845; New York City, U.S.
- Died: September 18, 1937 (aged 91); Southampton, New York, U.S.
- Education: Yale College
- Employer: W. & J. Sloane
- Spouse: Jessie Ann Robbins (m. 1880; div. 1889)
- Parent(s): William Sloane; Euphemia Douglas
- Relatives: William Douglas Sloane (brother); Henry Sloane Coffin (nephew); William Sloane Coffin (nephew); Henry-Louis de La Grange (grandson)

Henry Thompson Sloane (December 1, 1845 – September 18, 1937) was an American businessman during the Gilded Age.

== Early life ==
Sloane was born in New York City on December 1, 1845. He was the fourth son of William Sloane (1810–1879) and Euphemia (née Douglas) Sloane (1810–1886). Among his siblings was John Sloane, who married Adela Berry; Douglas Sloane; Mary Elizabeth Sloane; William Douglas Sloane, who married Emily Thorn Vanderbilt; and Euphemia (née Sloane) Coffin, who married Edmund Coffin and was the mother of Rev. Henry Sloane Coffin and William Sloane Coffin Sr.

His parents were emigrants from Kilmarnock, Scotland. His paternal grandparents were John Sloane and Jane Mary (née Lammie) Sloane, and his maternal grandparents were David and Margaret Douglas.

Sloane entered Yale College with the class of 1866, but left at the close of the first term of his senior year due to ill health. In 1869, Yale awarded him a degree.

== Career ==
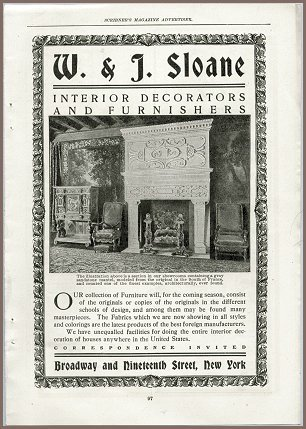
Advertisement for W. & J. Sloane Furniture from Sept. 1902 editions of Scribner's Magazine.

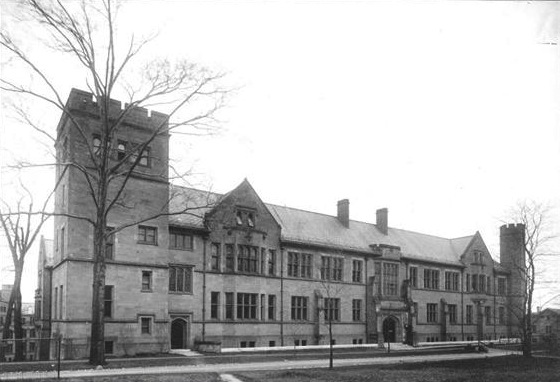
Sloane Physics Laboratory, the first science building completed after Sachem's Wood was purchased by Yale

Beginning at the age of fifteen, Sloane started working for the family carpet and furniture firm which was started by his father in 1843. In 1852, his uncle John W. Sloane joined the firm and it was renamed W. & J. Sloane.

He later became a member of the firm, and in 1870 was sent west to San Francisco to establish the California branch of the firm. When the company was incorporated in 1891, Sloane became a director and remained on the board until his death. He later served as a senior director and treasurer of the company. In his father and brother's memory, Sloane donated $515,000 to Yale for a large physics laboratory known as the Sloane Physics Laboratory.

He was a member of the New York Yacht Club, the Seawanhaka Corinthian Yacht Club (of which he was the oldest member at the time of his death), and the Pilgrim Club.

== Personal life ==
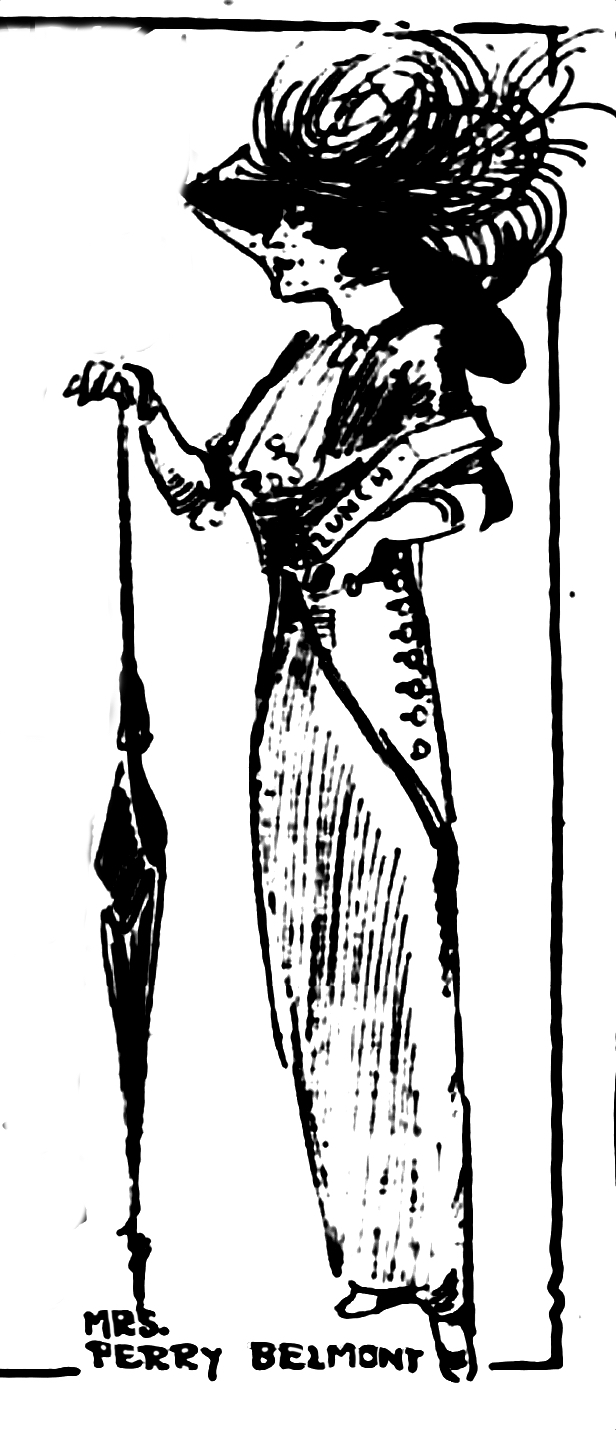
Jessie Ann Robbins Belmont in 1912 sketch by Marguerite Martyn of the St. Louis Post-Dispatch

In 1880, Sloane was married to Jessie Ann Robbins (1858–1935). Jessie was the daughter of Matilda Louisa (née Frost) Robbins and Daniel Cook Robbins, a partner in the wholesale drug firm of McKesson & Robbins. Together, they were the parents of two daughters:

- Jessie M. Sloane (1883–1968), who married William Earl Dodge IV (1883–1927), the son of William E. Dodge III and Emeline (née Harriman) Dodge, (Note: Dodge's maternal grandfather was Oliver Harriman and his aunts and uncles included Anne Harriman Vanderbilt, Oliver Harriman, Jr., J. Borden Harriman, and Herbert M. Harriman. After his father's death in 1884, his mother remarried to Stephen Henry Olin.) in 1905. They divorced and she married George Dunton Widener Jr. (1889–1971) in 1917.
- Emily Eleanor Sloane (1890–1981), who married Baron Amaury de la Grange (1888–1953), a French Senator, Under-Secretary of State of France, and Vice-President of the International Aviation Federation. He was held prisoner for five years during World War II by the Nazis.

On April 28, 1899, he and his wife divorced. Five hours later, she married Perry Belmont, a U.S. Representative and former U.S. Minister to Spain. While Sloane was rumored to have been engaged, he never remarried.

After a month's illness, Sloane died of pneumonia at the James T. Shewan house in Southampton, New York (which he had rented for the season) on September 18, 1937. After a funeral at St. Bartholomew's Church, he was buried at Woodlawn Cemetery in the Bronx. After his death, his paintings were sold at auction at the Parke-Bernet Galleries in New York in 1938.

=== Residence ===
After their marriage, the Sloanes lived at West 54th Street near Fifth Avenue. In 1894, Sloane completed the construction of a new residence located at 9 East 72nd Street on the Upper East Side of the borough of Manhattan, New York City. The mansion was designed by Carrère and Hastings in the late French Renaissance style. After the divorce, he rented the house to Joseph Pulitzer and, in 1901, he sold it to banker James A. Stillman and moved to 18 East 86th Street. In 1964, it housed the Lycée Français de New York, along with its extensions in the neighboring Oliver Gould Jennings House.

=== Descendants ===
Through his daughter Jessie, he was the grandfather of Diana Dodge (1910–1977), who married Frederick Martin Davies, a grandson of Daniel O'Neill, owner of the Pittsburgh Dispatch. (Note: Frederick's sister, Emily O'Neill Davies (1903–1935), was married three times; first to William Henry Vanderbilt III; second to Sigourney Thayer (for less than a year); and thirdly to Raoul Whitfield.) Through his daughter Emily, he was the grandfather of Amicie (née de La Grange) de Nicolay, Marie de La Grange (1919–1983), who married Henry Baldwin Hyde in 1941 (son of James Hazen Hyde and namesake and grandson of Henry Baldwin Hyde, the founder of The Equitable Life Assurance Society of the United States), and Henry-Louis de La Grange (1924–2017), a musicologist and biographer of Gustav Mahler.
