= Barbara Margolis =

Barbara Ann "Bobbie" Margolis (October 4, 1929 – July 3, 2009) was an American prisoners' rights advocate who served as the official greeter of New York City under the administration of Mayor of New York City Ed Koch. She established Fresh Start, a program under which inmates at Rikers Island receive culinary training from professional chefs.

== Early life and education ==
She was born as Barbara Ann Schneider in Malden, Massachusetts on October 4, 1929, and attended Boston's Simmons College, where she was awarded a bachelor's degree in retailing. While working as a security officer at the Massachusetts Institute of Technology in 1958, she met David Margolis. They married six months later, and moved to New York City in 1959.

While a volunteer at Rikers Island, she and her husband met future mayor Ed Koch when they were all seated at the same table while attending a 1967 dinner honoring a prison warden. Koch was sworn into office as mayor on December 31, 1977 at the Margolis home at 30 East 72nd Street. In 1979, she was named official greeter of New York City — officially the vice chairman of the City Commission for Distinguished Guests — the first woman to hold the honorary post which paid a salary of $1 per year. As greeter, she welcomed individuals such as Diana, Princess of Wales and Pope John Paul II.

== Rikers Island ==
Though her friends and family could not explain what triggered her involvement there, Margolis was involved in creating a wide range of programs for inmates at the Rikers Island prison facility operated by the New York City Department of Corrections.

In 1980, she helped re-establish The Rikers Review, a magazine that includes literature and advice produced by inmates for the prisoner population.

She ran Fresh Start from its creation in 1989 until 1997, with the goal of helping inmates to be released from prison find lower-level jobs in the food industry. As the program developed, it trained 60 people per year in classes given eight hours per day for a 10-week period covering the full range of restaurant jobs from preparing food to fixing equipment. The classes, some of which feature guest instructors from New York City restaurants, covers such areas as wine tasting, taught using different varieties of grape juice to address a prison ban on alcohol.

Efforts by Margolis to help ex-prisoners rehabilitate included drug treatment and therapy while at Rikers, as well as continuing interaction after release. Margolis would take calls from former program participants at all hours of the day, often months after their release, and she would reach out to ensure that they had items such as ties that they might need for an interview. While 46% of the general population released from city prisons were back in jail within a year of release, the one-year recidivism rate for graduates of the Fresh Start program was 25%. Inmates held her in such regard that after her car was stolen from the prison parking lot it was immediately returned once it was discovered that it was her car that had been taken.

== Personal ==
In addition to her apartment on the Upper East Side, she also had residences in Quogue, New York and Tourrettes-sur-Loup, France.

Margolis died at age 79 at Memorial Sloan-Kettering Cancer Center in Manhattan on July 3, 2009, due to complications from cancer. She was survived by a daughter, three sons and five grandchildren. Her husband died at age 78 on December 13, 2008, due to cardiac arrest.
