= Henry-Louis de La Grange =

French musicologist (1924–2017)

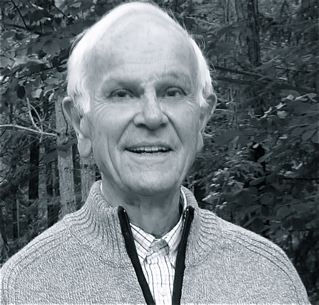
- Henry-Louis de La Grange in August 2010
- Born: 26 May 1924; Paris, France
- Died: 27 January 2017 (aged 92); Lonay, Switzerland
- Occupations: Musicologist, biographer
- Parent(s): Amaury de la Grange; Emily Sloane

Henry-Louis de La Grange (26 May 1924 – 27 January 2017) was a French musicologist and biographer of Gustav Mahler.

== Life and career ==
La Grange was born in Paris, of an American mother (Emily Sloane, daughter of Henry T. Sloane) and a French father, Amaury de la Grange, who was a senator, one-time government minister, and vice-president of the International Aviation Federation. Henry-Louis studied the humanities in Paris and New York and literature at Aix-en-Provence University and at the Sorbonne. From 1946 to 1947 he studied at the Yale University School of Music and subsequently, from 1948 until 1953, privately in Paris – piano under Yvonne Lefébure and harmony, counterpoint, and analysis under Nadia Boulanger.

La Grange began working as a music critic in 1952, writing articles for the New York Herald Tribune and The New York Times, and the magazines Opera News, Saturday Review, Musical America, and Opus in the United States, and Arts, Disques, La Revue Musicale, and Harmonie in France.

He first heard the music of Gustav Mahler, the Ninth Symphony, on 20 December 1945 at a concert in which Mahler's disciple, Bruno Walter, conducted the New York Philharmonic in its first performance of the work. La Grange had attended the concert because he had become a great admirer of the conductor, but knew very little about Mahler, who at the time was not nearly as well known as he is now. He was surprised at the length of the symphony and its unusual style, and his interest was piqued. Gradually becoming more and more interested, from the early 1950s on he began to seriously investigate Mahler's works and his life. He met Mahler's widow Alma Mahler in 1952, became a close friend of her daughter Anna, and interviewed other contemporaries of the composer. He carried out research in Europe and North America and over time accumulated a collection of materials which became one of the richest existing archives concerning Mahler and his epoch. These documents are now part of a multimedia library, the Médiathèque Musicale Mahler, founded in 1986 with Maurice Fleuret as the Bibliothèque Gustav Mahler.

The first volume of his definitive Mahler biography was published by Doubleday (New York) in 1973, and Gollancz (London) in 1974 and received the Deems Taylor Award (U.S. 1974). A revised edition in French was published by Fayard in 1979, followed by two more volumes in 1983 and 1984, the entire series reaching a final length of about 3600 pages. This work was recognized by the Prize for the Best Book on Music awarded by the Syndicat de la critique dramatique et musicale (France 1983), and the Grand Prix de Littérature musicale of the Académie Charles Cros (France 1984). Subsequently, Oxford University Press started to publish a revised and expanded English 4-volume version of the French 3-volume set, starting with Volume II in 1995 (awarded the Prize of the Royal Philharmonic Society in London), Volume III in 2000, and Volume IV in 2008. The revision of the English Volume I was incomplete at the time of La Grange's death; the work was completed by his associate, Sybille Werner. The revised first volume was released in April 2020.

Lecturing on Mahler for many years, Henry-Louis de La Grange toured the United States, Canada, England, Ireland, Sweden, Norway, Belgium, the Netherlands, the Czech Republic, Hungary, Spain, Italy, Morocco and, in the Far East, Japan, Hong Kong, Indonesia, the Philippines, Australia, and New Zealand. He spoke at Stanford University, Columbia University, and Indiana University (1974–81), the University of Geneva (1982), the University of Leipzig, the Juilliard School, the University of California at Los Angeles (1985), Budapest University (1987), the University of Hamburg (1988), the University of Oslo (1993), the Paris Conservatory, as well as the universities in Kyoto, Hong Kong, Wellington, Sydney, Canberra, Melbourne, Boulder, and San Francisco (1998), and taught a DEA seminar at the École Normale Supérieure in Paris (1986).

He directed the Festival "Les Nuits d'Alziprato" in Corsica for five years (1974–1979), and in the Summer of 1986 the Mahler Festival in Toblach (Dobbiaco, Italy), produced or took part in many broadcasts on radio and television, including 34 two-hour programs on France Musique (Radio) on the life and work of Mahler, six one-hour programs for WGUC (Public Radio) in Cincinnati, U.S.A, and a series of six on Mahler's last years for Radio Suisse Romande. He also collaborated in the conception and production of the first large-scale exhibition on Mahler: "Une Oeuvre, une Vie, une Epoque" at the Musée d'Art moderne, Paris, in 1985, which attracted over 27,000 visitors, thus breaking all previous records for a musical exhibition. In the same context, he organized two international Mahler symposiums, in Paris and Montpellier. On the occasion of the complete Mahler cycle performed at the Théâtre du Châtelet in Paris from February to May 1989, he mounted two exhibitions, one at the Châtelet and the other at the Bibliothèque Gustav Mahler, gave 5 lectures, and organized a symposium at the Sorbonne.

La Grange acted as advisor for the Mahler cycle given by the Orchestre National de Lyon from 1991 to 1994 and, in 1999, organized an International Symposium about "Irony in Mahler's Music" at the University of Montpellier. In 1998, he spent three weeks in San Francisco as guest lecturer for the San Francisco Symphony's "Mahler Celebration", and he was one of the first European musicologists to lecture about Mahler in Beijing. He toured the United States and Mexico as a lecturer in 2000, and in 2002 he gave four pre-concert talks in Philadelphia and New York for the Philadelphia Orchestra.

La Grange died on 27 January 2017 in Lonay, Morges District, Switzerland.

== Honors and awards ==
- Title of Professor, Austrian government, 1988
- A collection of Mahler essays by distinguished scholars was published in 1997 as a Festschrift in honor of Henry-Louis de La Grange's seventieth birthday.
- Charles Flint Kellogg Award in Arts and Letters from Bard College, 2002
- Medal of Officer of the Order of the Légion d'honneur (2006)
- Österreichisches Ehrenkreuz für Wissenschaft und Kunst 1. Klasse (2010)
- IGMG Vienna, Gold Medal of the Internationale Gustav Mahler Gesellschaft (2010)
- Honorary Doctor of Music, The Juilliard School, 2010

== Selected publications ==
=== Books ===
- Mahler, vol. I (1860–1901). Garden City, New York: Doubleday & Co, 1973, 982 pages, ISBN 978-0-385-00524-1.
- Mahler, vol. I (1860–1901). London: Gollancz, 1974, 987 pages, ISBN 978-0-575-01672-9.
- Gustav Mahler (in French, three volumes):
  - vol. 1: Les chemins de la gloire (1860–1899). Paris: Fayard, 1979, 1149 pages, ISBN 978-2-213-00661-1.
  - vol. 2: L'âge d'or de Vienne (1900–1907). Paris: Fayard, 1983, 1278 pages, ISBN 978-2-213-01281-0.
  - vol. 3: Le génie foudroyé (1907–1911). Paris: Fayard, 1984, 1361 pages, ISBN 978-2-213-01468-5.
- Gustav Mahler (in English, revised and expanded from the French, three volumes of a four volume edition):
  - vol. 1: The Arduous Road to Vienna (1860–1897). Turnhout: Brepols, 2020, 809 pages, ISBN 978-2-503-58814-8.
  - vol. 2: Vienna: The Years of Challenge (1897–1904). Oxford: Oxford University Press, 1995, 892 pages, ISBN 978-0-19-315159-8.
  - vol. 3: Vienna: Triumph and Disillusion (1904–1907). Oxford: Oxford University Press, 2000, 1000 pages, ISBN 978-0-19-315160-4.
  - vol. 4: A New Life Cut Short (1907–1911). Oxford: Oxford University Press, 2008, 1758 pages, ISBN 978-0-19-816387-9.
- Vienne, une histoire musicale (in French, two volumes):
  - vol. 1: 1100–1848. Arles: Bernard Coutaz, 1990, 261 pages, ISBN 978-2-87712-008-1.
  - vol. 2: 1848 à nos jours. Arles: Bernard Coutaz, 1991, 261 pages, ISBN 978-2-87712-047-0.
- Vienne, une histoire musicale (in French, combined edition). Paris: Fayard, 1995, 417 pages, ISBN 978-2-213-59580-1 (also translated into German and Spanish).
- Mahler: A la recherche de l'infini perdu, translated into Japanese by Takashi Funayama. Tokyo: Soshiba, 1993, 277 pages, ISBN 978-4-7942-0519-3.
- Ein Glück ohne Ruh' – Die Briefe Gustav Mahlers an Alma (in German, first complete edition), edited with Günther Weiß and Knud Martner, Berlin: Siedler Verlag, 1995, 575 pages, ISBN 978-3-88680-577-8.
- Op zoek naar Gustav Mahler [Researching Gustav Mahler], translated into Dutch by Ernst van Altena. Amsterdam: Landsmeer, Meulenhoff, 1995, 127 pages, ISBN 978-90-290-4932-0.
- Gustav Mahler: Letters to his Wife, ed. Henry-Louis de La Grange, Güther Weiß, and Knud Martner, translated into English by Antony Beaumont. Ithaca: Cornell University Press, 2004, 431 pages, ISBN 978-0-8014-4340-4.

=== Other publications ===
- A collection of his articles and lectures was published in Japanese in 1992 by ARC (Tokyo), Japan.
- For ten years (1986–1995) he reviewed new Mahler recordings for the French magazine Diapason and also wrote occasionally for Le Monde, L’Événement du Jeudi, Le Monde de la musique, Opus (Chatsworth, California: ABC Consumer Magazines), Scherzo (Madrid), Amadeus (Milano) and Le Nouvel Observateur.
- Program notes for the Orchestre de Paris about all of Mahler's orchestral works (1971–88).
- Liner notes of LPs and CDs for numerous recordings of Mahler (in particular the Deutsche Grammophon symphony cycle by Pierre Boulez), as well as other composers ranging from Brahms to Tchaikovsky.
- Numerous contributions to scholarly publications.
