= 72nd Street (Manhattan) =

West-east street in Manhattan, New York

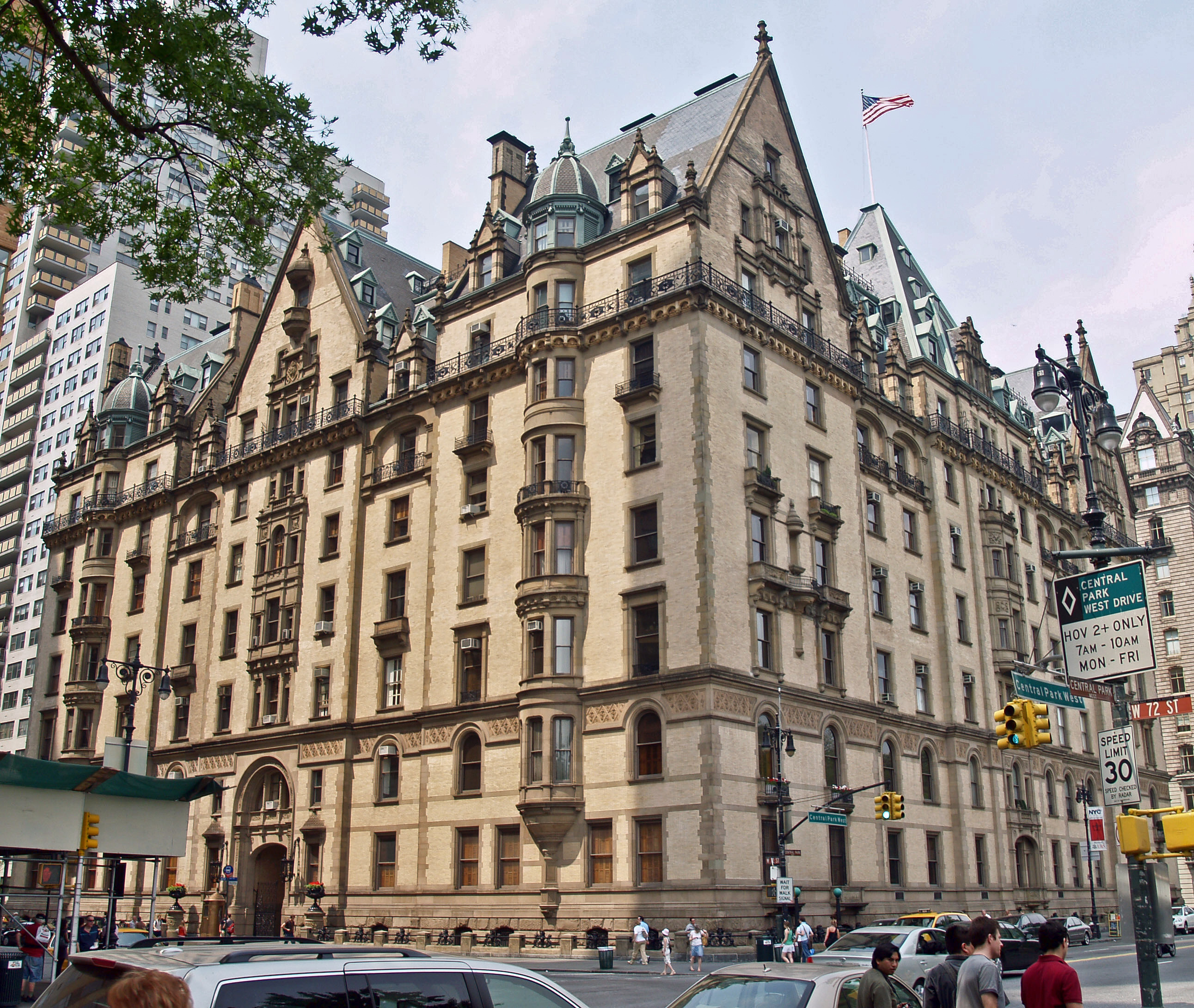
- The Dakota Apartments, located at 1 West 72nd Street
- Maintained by: NYCDOT
- Length: 1.6 mi (2.6 km)
- Width: 100 feet (30.48 m)
- Location: Manhattan
- Postal code: 10023 (west), 10021 (east)
- Coordinates: 40.7721°N 73.9662°W
- West end: NY 9A / Henry Hudson Parkway in Riverside South
- East end: Dead end in Upper East Side
- North: 73rd Street
- South: 71st Street

Construction
- Commissioned: 1811

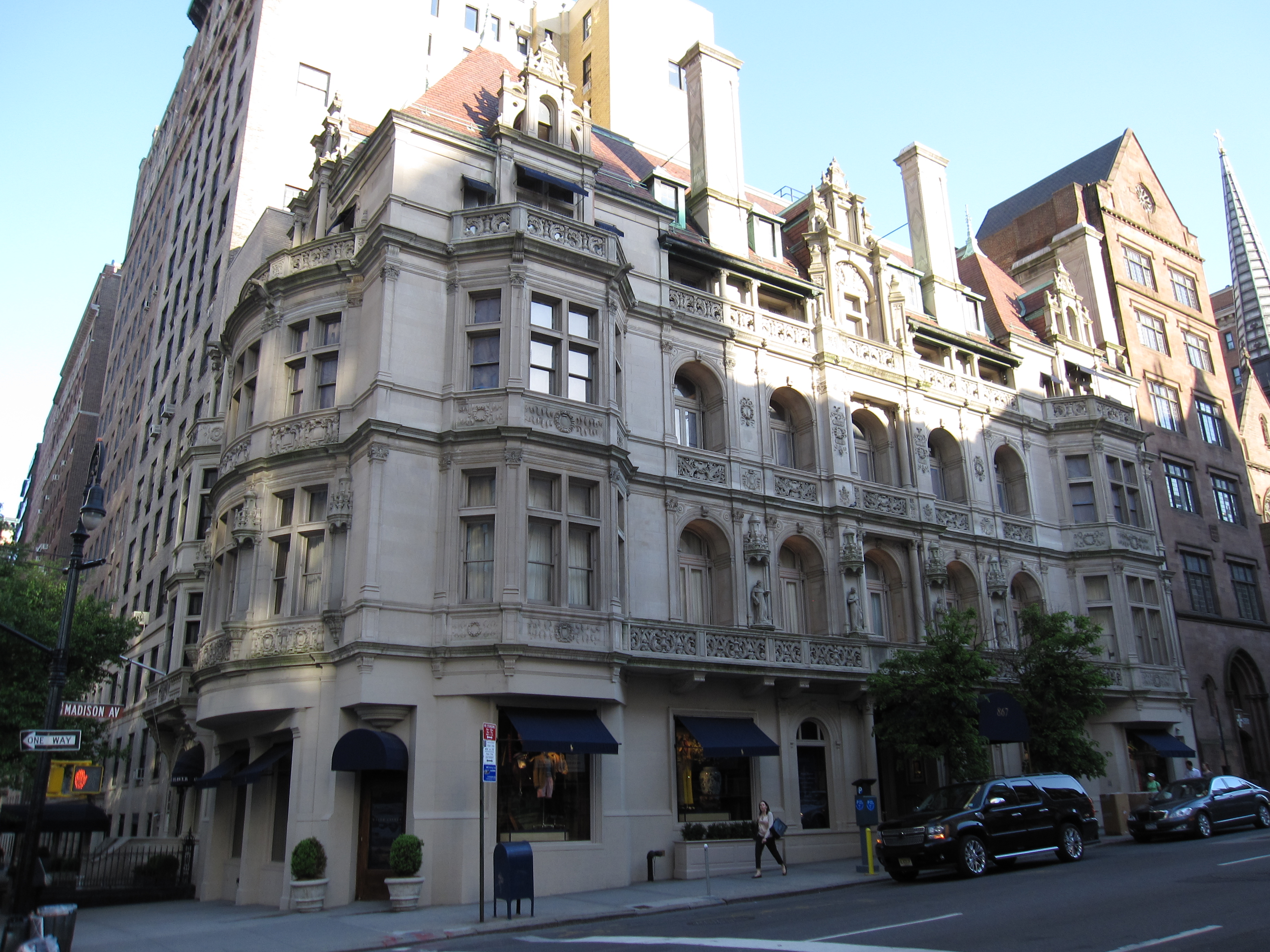
The Gertrude Rhinelander Waldo House, 72nd Street and Madison Avenue.

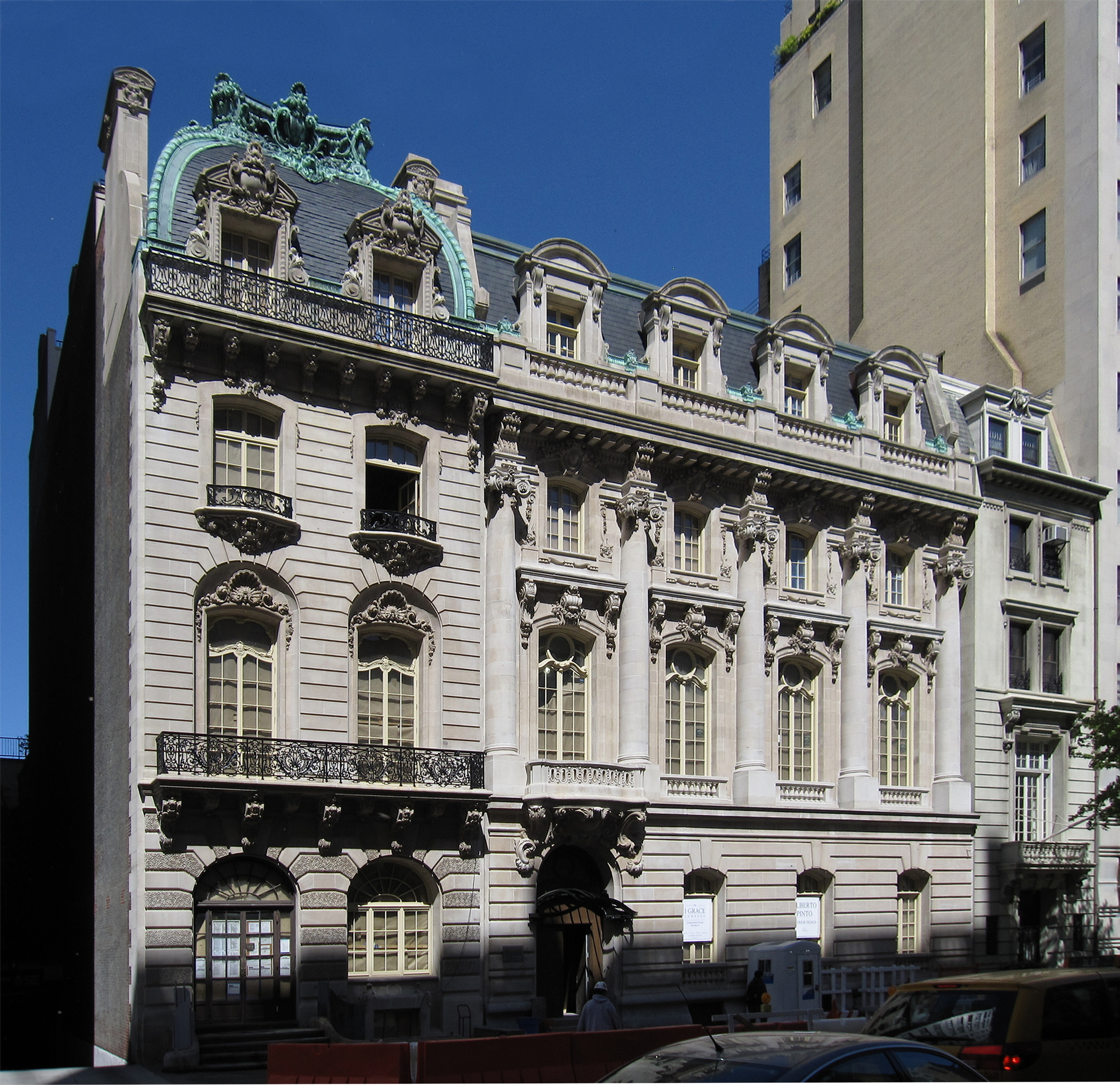
The Henry T. Sloane House and Oliver Gould Jennings House on 7–9 East 72nd Street

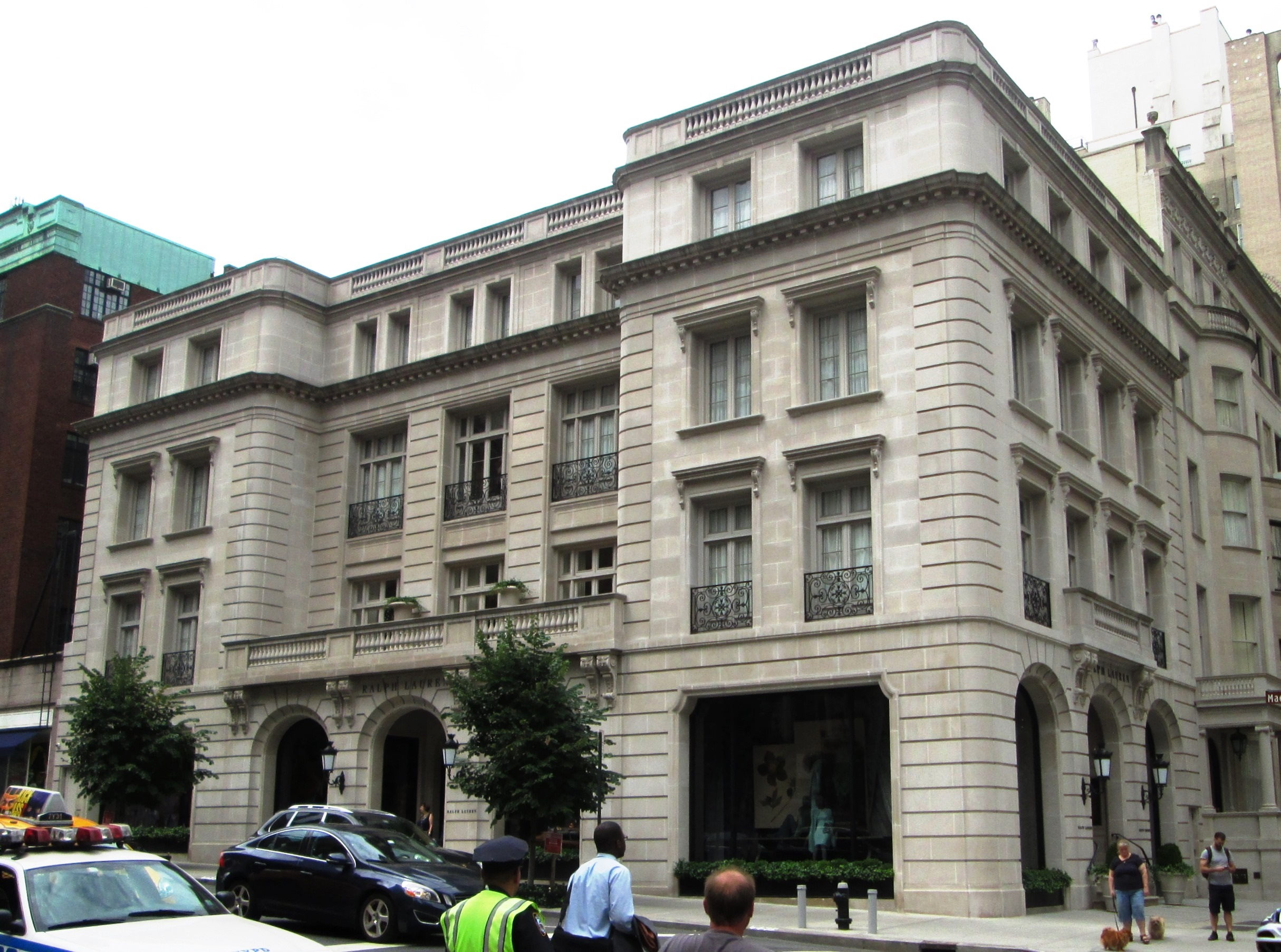
888 Madison Avenue at East 72nd Street, constructed for Ralph Lauren in 2010

72nd Street is one of the major bi-directional crosstown streets in New York City's borough of Manhattan. The street primarily runs through the Upper West Side and Upper East Side neighborhoods. It is one of the few streets to go through Central Park via Women's Gate, Terrace Drive, and Inventors Gate, though Terrace Drive is often closed to vehicular traffic.

== History ==
The street was designated by the Commissioners' Plan of 1811 that established the Manhattan street grid as one of 15 east-west streets that would be 100 feet (30 m) in width (while other streets were designated as 60 feet (18 m) in width).

On October 11, 2006, the Belaire Apartments, a 50-story apartment complex located at 524 E. 72nd Street between York Avenue and FDR Drive, was the site of a plane crash involving Cory Lidle's aircraft.

== Landmarks ==
=== East Side ===
At Third Avenue, the Tower East apartment block (1960) set a new model for high-rise residences: a slab tower set back from the street front and isolated on a low base.

The architects McKim, Mead & White’s mansion for Charles L. Tiffany, built in 1882 at the northeast corner of Madison Avenue, was demolished in 1936 and replaced by an apartment block (19 East 72nd Street) designed by the architects Mott B. Schmidt and Rosario Candela.). The Rhinelander Mansion, on the southeast corner, is now occupied by Ralph Lauren.

The mansion that once stood at the southeast corner of Fifth Avenue was the first of the Gilded Age mansions to be replaced by an apartment block, 907 Fifth Avenue.

=== West Side ===
The Dakota apartment building is located on the northwest corner of West 72nd Street and Central Park West.

The Park & Tilford Building, on the southwest corner of West 72nd St and Columbus Avenue, built by the eponymous retailer, was designed by McKim Mead and White. The New York Times observed that the opening in September 1893, "was attended by hundreds, who admired the building and the artistic display of goods." The article added "There is no business building more handsome on the west side" and the New-York Tribune called it "a decided architectural ornament to the neighborhood." The building was converted into residential apartments in 1972.

At 72nd Street, Broadway crosses Amsterdam Avenue, creating a small triangular space, Verdi Square; across the street to the south lies Sherman Square.

The Eleanor Roosevelt Monument at the southern tip of Riverside Park marks the intersection of 72nd Street and Riverside Drive. The Chatsworth Apartments (344 West 72nd Street), a designated landmark designed by the architect John E. Scharsmith, sits at 72nd Street's western end, where it curves into Riverside Boulevard.

== Transportation ==
72nd Street has three New York City Subway stops along its length:

- 72nd Street at Broadway and Amsterdam Avenue served by the 1, 2, and 3 trains
- 72nd Street at Central Park West served by the A, B, and C trains
- 72nd Street at Second Avenue served by the N, Q, and R trains

The M72 provides crosstown bus service to Upper East Side – York Avenue (eastbound) or West Side – Freedom Place (westbound) via 72nd Street. The M72 bus crosses Central Park at 65th Street, because Terrace Drive within the park is often closed to vehicular traffic. Westbound service begins at First Avenue. The M5 and M57 provide additional service west of Broadway, heading north on Riverside Drive and south on West End Avenue, respectively.

The New York Central Railroad's 72nd Street station previously existed on Park Avenue, which now carries the Park Avenue main line of the Metro-North Railroad. The station closed in approximately 1901, and an emergency exit is the only vestige of the station's existence.

In 2026, the New York City Department of Transportation proposed adding a two-way protected bike lane on West 72nd Street. This plan would entail removing one lane of traffic. The plan has been endorsed by the local community, but a state judge issued an injunction in July 2026, preventing the bike lane's implementation.

== Notable residents ==
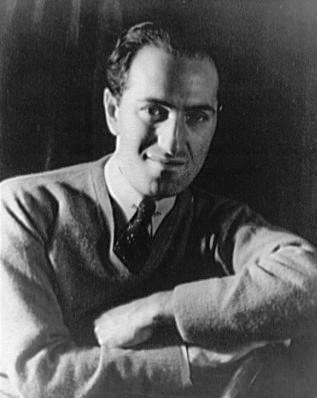
George Gershwin

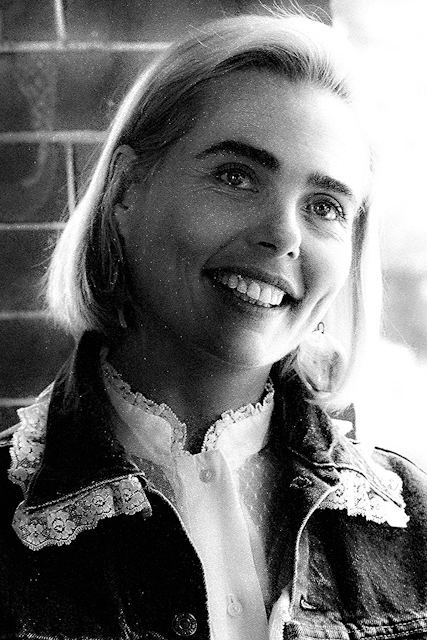
Margaux Hemingway

- Manny Acta, major league baseball manager, 524 East 72nd Street
- Robert Agostinelli, self-made billionaire financier, 36 East 72nd Street
- Allan Arbus, actor, 319 East 72nd Street
- Arthur Ashe, tennis player, 360 East 72nd Street
- Lauren Bacall, actress, 1 West 72nd Street
- Ivan Boesky, stock trader, 524 East 72nd Street
- Carol Higgins Clark, mystery author, 524 East 72nd Street
- Thomas E. Dewey, two-time Governor of New York, 141 East 72nd Street
- Marc Eidlitz, builder, 123 East 72nd Street
- Joan Fontaine, British-American actress, 160 East 72nd Street
- Jolie Gabor, jewelry designer, socialite, and mother to Zsa Zsa Gabor, 530 East 72nd Street
- Alex Gard, cartoonist
- George Gershwin, composer and pianist, 132 East 72nd Street
- Hugh J. Grant, mayor of New York City, 20 East 72nd Street
- Helene Hanff, author of 84, Charing Cross Road, 305 E. 72nd Street (now re-named "Charing Cross House" in her honor)
- Margaux Hemingway, model and actress, 12 East 72nd Street
- Louise Huff, actress, 155 East 72nd Street
- John Lennon, musician, songwriter, 1 West 72nd Street
- Barbara Margolis, prisoners' rights advocate, 30 East 72nd Street
- David Margolis, industrialist, 30 East 72nd Street
- Louis Marshall, lawyer, 47 East 72nd Street
- James Merrill, poet, author of "164 East 72nd Street"
- Yoko Ono, artist, activist, 1 West 72nd Street
- Dorothy Parker, writer, satirist, 214 West 72nd Street
- George Plimpton, writer, editor, New York City fireworks commissioner, 541 East 72nd Street
- Lee Radziwill, actress and socialite, 160 East 72nd Street
- Jason Robards, Jr., actor, 1 West 72nd Street
- Marvin R. Shanken, publisher, 524 East 72nd Street
- Frank Sinatra, singer, owned a three-level penthouse at 530 East 72nd Street
- Winthrop H. Smith, investment banker
- Harold Stanley, cofounder of Morgan Stanley, 4 East 72nd Street
- John Steinbeck, writer, 190 and 206 East 72nd Street
- James Stillman, businessman, 9 East 72nd Street
- Aileen Osborn Webb, patron of crafts
