= Russell Menard =

Russell Menard (1942–2023), was emeritus Professor at the University of Minnesota specialized in the economic and social history of the British colonies in North America. He earned his Ph.D. at the University of Iowa in 1975. Most of his work has been on the economic, demographic, and social history of the Chesapeake region during the early colonial period, but his research interests included the origins of plantation slavery in British America, the economic development of the Lower South in the 18th century, and late 19th-century U.S. social history. Before his death he was doing work on the West Indies.

Menard taught undergraduate and graduate courses on early American history, economic history, and the history of slavery.

Menard, with his collaborator John McCusker, co-authored The Economy of British America, a landmark volume that emphasized the importance of the "staple thesis" for understanding the development and evolution of colonial societies from New England down to the West Indies. Menard published dozens of articles and book chapters, but his most well known piece, “From Servants to Slaves: The Transformation of the Chesapeake Labor System” (1977). He saw the connection on how larger economic forces had a bearing on regions, communities, and individual choice. His interest in labor, commodity, and land markets shaped not only the thinking of historians, but also that of economists.

For years Menard was a key member in the University of Minnesota's Early American History Workshop. Workshop participants represented many disciplines: history, American Studies, economics, demography, literature, religious studies, public policy, and women's studies. Papers covered a wide temporal sweep from the colonial period to the American Civil War and a broad geographical and spatial scope encompassing the histories of Canada, New England, the Middle Atlantic, the Lower South, the West Indies, Latin America, slavery, and native people.

== Books ==
- Robert Cole's World: Agriculture and Society in Early Maryland
- Migrants, Servants and Slaves: Unfree Labor in Colonial British America
- With John J. McCusker, The Economy of British America, 1607-1789
- Sweet Negotiations: Sugar, Slavery, And Plantation Agriculture in Early Barbados
