= Forsyth Wickes =

Art collector (1876–1964)

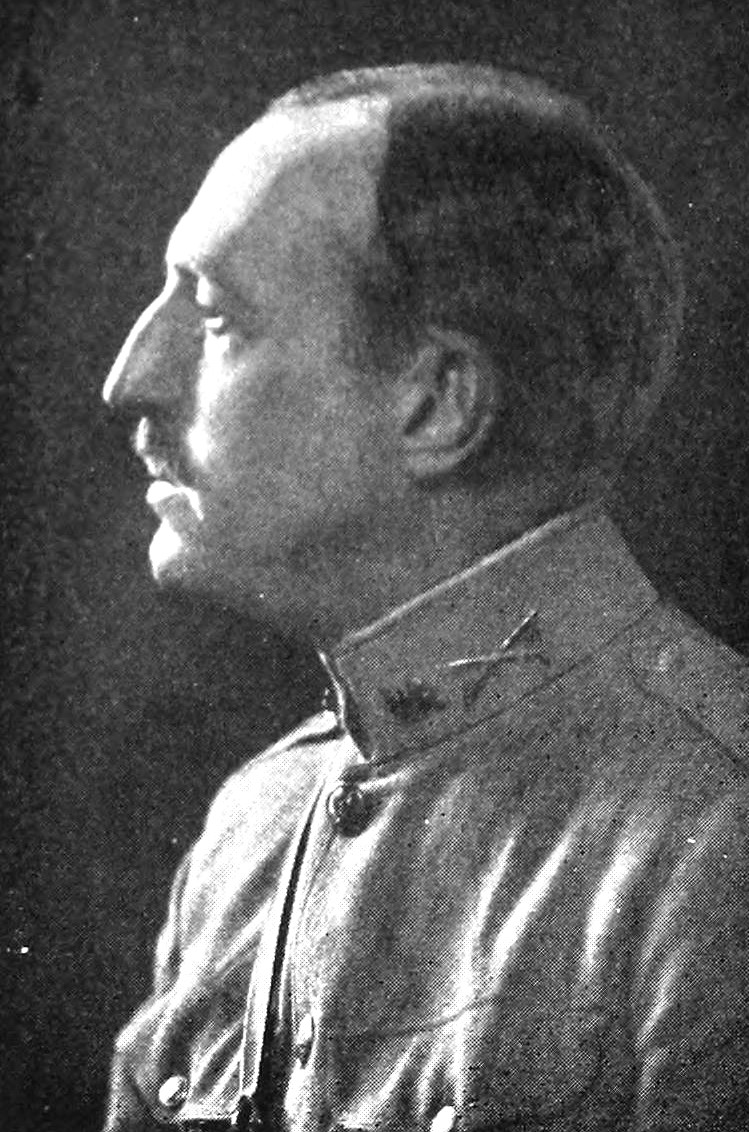
- Born: October 26, 1876; New York City, New York, U.S.
- Died: December 20, 1964 (aged 88); Newport, Rhode Island, U.S.
- Education: St. Mark's School (1894); Yale University (1898); Columbia Law School (1900)
- Awards: Distinguished Service Medal, Legion of Honour, Croix de Guerre

Forsyth Wickes (October 26, 1876 – December 20, 1964) was an art collector and philanthropist.

== Early life ==
Wickes was born in New York City on October 26, 1876. He was the son of Edward Allen Wickes (1843–1918) and Mary Forsyth Wickes (1847–1933).

He spent much of his childhood in France and graduated from St. Mark's School in Southborough, Massachusetts, in 1894.

He graduated from Yale University in 1898 and Columbia Law School in 1900, where he was one of the founders of the Columbia Law Review. He was a lawyer by profession and became the senior partner of Wickes, Riddell, Bloomer, Jacobi and McGuire in New York City.

He married Marian Arnot Haven (1880–1969), with whom he had four daughters.

== First World War ==
Wickes joined the U.S. Army and entered the Plattsburgh Training Camp in August, 1917. He was commissioned as a captain in the Infantry on November 8, 1917. He was shipped immediately overseas for service with the War Risk Insurance. He arrived in Paris on December 26, and was assigned to direct the processing of war risk insurance for officers and men of the 1st, 2nd, 42nd and 26th Divisions stationed at Neufchâteau.

On February 1, 1918, he was appointed as the Assistant Chief Liaison Officer for organizing liaison service in Paris and surrounding areas, as well as the army in the field. In late March, 1918 he was assigned to the general staff of the 1st Division, and served with the 1st Division from April to June, being stationed during this period with the 162nd and 60th French Divisions.

He was reassigned in July to the staff of the American V Corps, and was stationed with the French 33rd Corps in the Vosges, remaining there until September. He was then reassigned to the staff of Major General Paul A. M. Maistre, commander of the French Group of Armies of the center, and served there until December 19, 1918. Wickes was promoted to the rank of major on September 12, 1918.

During the above period the 1st Division (American) and the 162nd and 60th French Divisions held a portion of the line in front of Montdidier. The French 33rd Corps held the Vosges mountains from north of Saint-Dié to Thann. General Maistre commanded the 4th and 5th French Armies on the left of the American 1st Army in the Argonne.

After the Armistice in November, Wickes was ordered home in December, 1918 and mustered out of the service on January 7, 1919.

In recognition of his service, Wickes was awarded the Army Distinguished Service Medal, the French Legion of Honour and was also cited by General Maistre for which he received the Croix de Guerre with palm.

== Interests ==
Wickes lived in France during his childhood and acquired a keen and large interest in French art. His collection of porcelains and of 18th century French art was considered outstanding. In the book "Great Private Collections," published in 1963, his collection was listed as one of the 26 most outstanding collections in the world and was one of only ten in the United States.

Wickes had lectured at the Metropolitan Museum of Art and exhibited loan collections in Copenhagen and at the Carnegie Institute.

In 1963 he was named honorary president of the board of directors of the city‐owned Musée Carnavalet, on which he had served 30 years. He was chairman of the board of the Lycée Français de New York, a trustee of the New York Historical Society and member of the French Institute of New York. He was also a leading member of the Alliance Française—an international organization to promote French language and culture.

== Residences ==
He maintained residences in Manhattan and Tuxedo Park, New York.

Prior to 1948 he had a home in Paris as well as the chateau de Courtmoulin (1929) near Gaillon located in Eure.

He owned two adjacent estates on Narragansett Avenue in Newport, Rhode Island—Zeerust, which was his primary residence, and Starboard House, which housed much of his extensive art collection.

== Memberships ==
He was a member of the Knickerbocker Club of New York, and the Clambake Club, Newport Country Club, Newport Reading Room and Bailey's Beach in Newport.

== Death ==
Wickes died at his home in Newport on December 20, 1964, at the age of 88. He was buried in Cedar Hill Cemetery in Newburgh, New York.

== Philanthropy ==
Wickes' will dictated that his executors would donate his art collection to a suitable institution. In December, 1965 it was decided to donate the collection to the Museum of Fine Arts in Boston. His estate also donated a large number of books on military subjects to the library of the United States Naval War College in Newport.

Wickes provided for the base and plaques for the statue of the Comte de Rochambeau which stands in King Park in Newport, Rhode Island.

== Awards ==
- Distinguished Service Medal
- Victory Medal
- Grand Officer of the Legion of Honor (France)
- Croix de Guerre with palm (France)

Distinguished Service Medal citation:

He showed rare ability in the preliminary organization of the American Liaison Service, and wide comprehension of the importance of forward Inter-Allied Liaison. While attached to the French Division in Liaison with the First American Division, he performed exacting duties of a delicate nature with tact and energy, achieving signal success. He aided materially in the maintenance of cordial relations between the French and American Military Authorities, his service being continually marked by ability, sound judgment and devotion to duty.
