= 36 East 72nd Street =

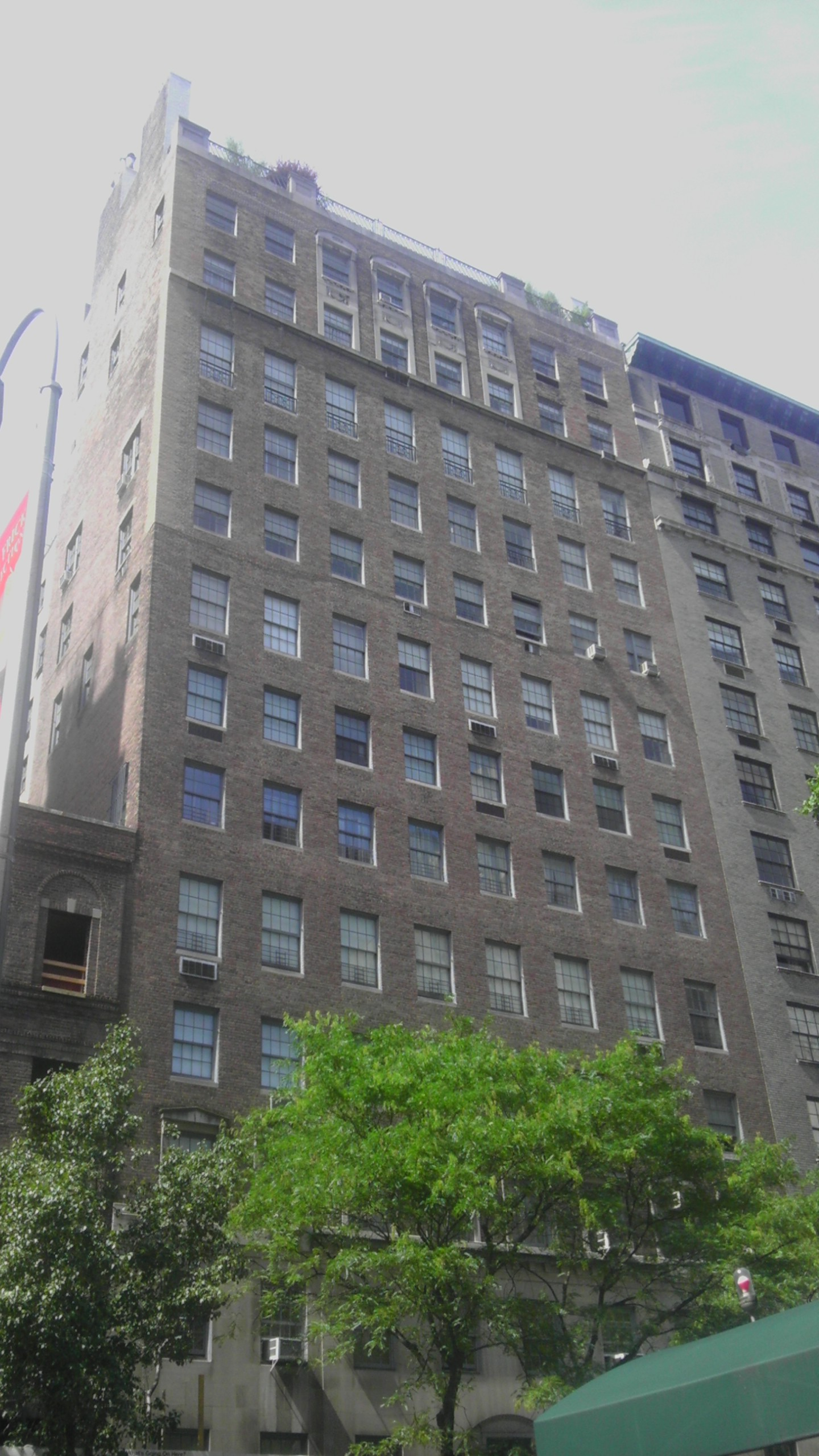
- Interactive map of the 36 East 72nd Street area

General information
- Type: Condominium
- Location: 36 East 72nd Street, New York, NY
- Coordinates: 40.771507°N 73.965025°W
- Current tenants: approx. 17+ tenants
- Construction started: 1927
- Completed: 1927
- Cost: $5m+

Height
- Top floor: PH

Technical details
- Structural system: Skyscraper
- Floor count: 15 (17 apartments)
- Floor area: 3,500 sq ft+

Design and construction
- Architects: Pleasants Pennington and Albert W. Lewis
- Awards: NYTT

36 East 72nd Street is a luxury residential housing cooperative on the Upper East Side of Manhattan, New York City. In 1995 it was ranked among the top 10 cooperative buildings in Manhattan by The New Yorker. Well-known residents have included Robert Agostinelli and Carlos Brillembourg. The 15-story, 1927 building has only 17 apartments.
