= Lycée Français de New York =

School in Manhattan, New York

- 505 East 75th Street (2026)

Location
- 505 East 75th Street; New York City, New York 10021; United States; 40°46′07″N 73°57′06″W

Information
- School type: Co-op
- Established: October 1935; First charter: April 17, 1936
- Founders: Charles de Ferry de Fontnouvelle; Forsyth Wickes; Paul Windels, Sr.
- Principal: Jérémie Bourdon
- Grades: Nursery - 12
- Gender: Girls and boys
- Age: 3 to 18
- Language: French and English
- Publication: The Fridge (literary magazine)
- Newspaper: L'oeil du Lynx
- Website: www.lfny.org

The Lycée français de New York (LFNY), commonly called the Lycée (in English, "The French High School of New York"), is an independent bilingual French school based in Manhattan, New York City. The school serves students from Nursery-3 to grade 12. The Lycée is accredited by the New York State Association of Independent Schools and the French Ministry of Education; it receives no funding from the government of France.

The Lycée offers a standard French curriculum taught by French-trained teachers. In parallel, students follow an American program, taught by U.S.-trained teachers, similar to what is found in New York City independent schools. Students study for the French general Baccalauréat, the international option of the French Baccalaureate, or French Baccalaureate International (BFI), as well as the American High School Diploma. The school has over 1350 students from more than 65 different nationalities. The student to teacher ratio is approximately 7:1.

== History ==
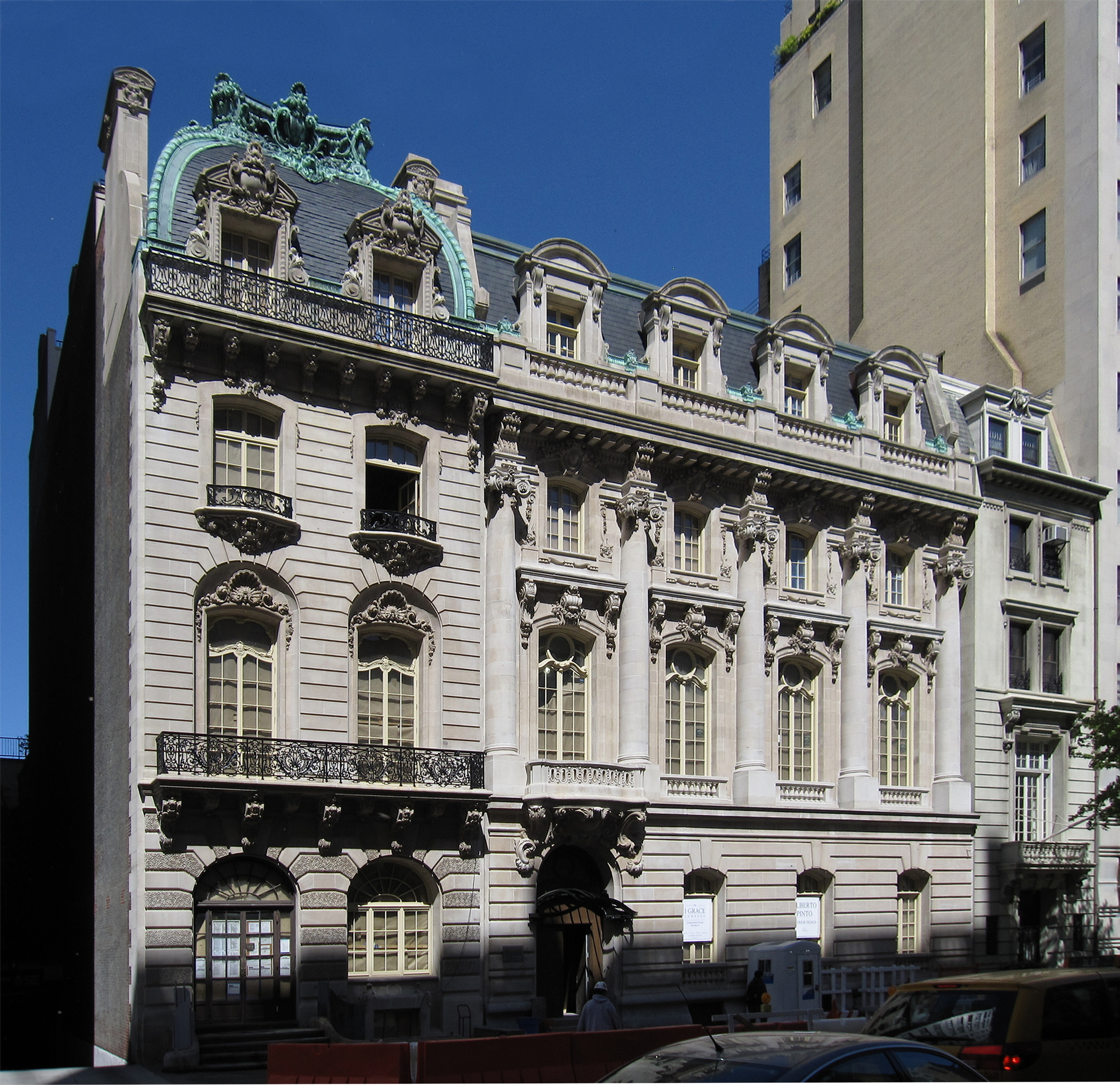
Former 72nd Street home, 7 East 72nd Street and 9 East 72nd Street

In the mid-1930s the Lycée was the brainchild of the then French consul general in New York, Comte Charles de Ferry de Fontnouvelle. He enlisted the help of Forsythe Wicks, a lawyer and businessman who was the president of the Alliance Française, and Paul Windels, Sr., the corporation counsel of the City of New York. Others involved in the founding of the Lycée include Nicholas Murray Butler, the president of Columbia University; Jesse Straus, the U.S. ambassador to France; and Jean Marx, the director of cultural affairs at the Quai d'Orsay. The Lycée granted its first baccalaureate degree in 1938. Since 1935 over 36,000 students have studied at the Lycée, and more than 150 nationalities have been represented throughout the school's history.

De Fontnouvelle served as the school's first president from 1935 until his death in 1956. He was succeeded by two interim presidents: Jean de Siéyès (president or former president of the French-American Banking Corporation) from de Fontnouvelle's death until the end of the school year; and Robert Lacour-Gayet (a writer and academic) for the next school year. Then, Mr. Maurice Galy became the school's president starting in 1957, a post he held until he retired in 1989.

== Curriculum ==
The school curriculum parallels the academic program laid out by the French Ministry of National Education and used in French schools throughout the world. This curriculum is supplemented by the essential elements advanced in American private-school education.

LFNY Students pursue their post-secondary education in US, Canadian, French and British universities and colleges.

== Facilities ==
The school originally occupied a residential building at 3 East 95th Street near Fifth Avenue (Mrs. Amory S. Carhart House), and Mr. Galy arranged for the acquisition of three more landmark mansions, two on East 72nd Street (Henry T. Sloane House and Oliver Gould Jennings House) and one on East 93rd Street (Mrs. Graham Fair Vanderbilt House)." In 2003, the school completed a modern, 158,000-square-foot (14,700 m2) state-of-the-art facility located at 505 East 75th Street. Taking up nearly a full city block, it houses the upper and lower schools and features such amenities as a 354-seat auditorium and two full-size gymnasiums.

The modern Lycée building was designed by the New York-based architecture firm Polshek Partnership Architects (now Ennead) in 2003. It consists of two LEED-certified buildings linked together by a patio, serving as a walkway, but also a lawn where students congregate and play. The North building (76th street) houses the pre-school and elementary schools while the middle school and high school students are taught in the South building (75th street). All students share the cafeteria, the auditorium and two gymnasiums. The facade of the building is made of stainless glass, and the exterior walls are dedicated to great writers, artists, scientists, philosophers and activists of Francophone and American thought.

The building was actually remodeled from what had previously been a Volkswagen Car Dealership and five-story garage from at least the early 1970s through the 1980s (the exact year that dealership closed is unknown).

In 2016, the Lycée opened its new York Wing, a 19,000 square-foot addition, on York Avenue. The wing has classrooms, a Media Lab with a working television studio and recording equipment, as well as a Makerspace, with equipment for carpentry, 3D printing, laser-cutting, and robotics. Faculty trained in the use of media, technology and fabrication work with existing faculty to integrate these spaces into the curriculum.

== Cultural Center of the Lycée ==
Throughout the school year, the Cultural Center offers a program of evening and weekend events and activities focused on French and Francophone culture. This program is open to the public, and includes free film screenings once a month and regular panels. Three times a year the Cultural Center presents music concerts featuring leading French and Francophone artists in jazz, classical and world music. Guests have included Ayo, Cécile McLorin Salvant, Francis Cabrel, and Camille Bertault.

== Student body ==
In 2012, while campaigning to represent the first constituency for French residents overseas, Julien Balkany criticized the school for prioritizing the children of American celebrities—including Madonna, Angelina Jolie, and Donald Trump—over the children of French citizens for admissions.

== Tuition ==
The Lycée Français de New York has a tuition of $48,050. Financial Aid (bourses de scolarité) is given to students based on need. The Lycée is a private, independent school and receives no funding from the French government; however, children of French citizens are eligible for tuition grants from the French State based on need. These are independent from the Lycée's own financial aid program and are allocated directly to the families, not the school. The Lycée holds a yearly Gala to raise money to support financial aid, among other things.

== See also ==
- Agence pour l'enseignement français à l'étranger
- Education in France
- American School of Paris - An American international school in France
