= David Margolis (industrialist) =

American businessman

David Israel Margolis (January 24, 1930 – December 13, 2008) was an American industrialist who served as president and chairman of Colt Industries, who was a confidant of former Mayor of New York City Ed Koch.

Margolis was born on January 24, 1930. He became the assistant treasurer at Raytheon and treasurer of International Telephone & Telegraph (ITT). Margolis met Harold Geneen at a Boston company in the 1950s and later followed him to ITT.

He met his wife, the former Barbara Ann Schneider, in 1958, when she was a security officer at the Massachusetts Institute of Technology. They married six months later, and moved to New York City in 1959.

Margolis was president of Colt Industries from 1962 to 1995, a firm founded in 1836 by Samuel Colt, and served as the company's chairman from 1984 to 1995. Margolis heavily invested in the company, expanding its original roles as a firearms manufacturer into a producer of machinery for the aerospace, automobile, chemical and petroleum industries, bringing the company’s revenues to $1.6 billion and his reported beneficial stake to 35.2% in 1988.

Margolis and his wife Bobbie, then a volunteer at Rikers Island, met the future mayor at a 1967 dinner honoring a prison warden, where they were all seated at the same table. Edward Koch was sworn into office as mayor on December 31, 1977 at the Margolis home. In 1979, his wife was named official greeter of New York City—officially the vice chairman of the City Commission for Distinguished Guests—the first woman to hold the honorary post which paid a salary of $1 per year.

A 1980 profile in The New York Times called Margolis Koch's right-hand man, quoting Koch who called him one of his "closest friends and advisors". Though Margolis played down his relationship with the mayor, he was described as playing the behind-the-scenes role as the mayor's unofficial labor expert during the 1980 New York City transit strike, in which subway workers were on picket lines for 11 days. Koch included Margolis in City Hall strategy sessions and consulted with him on budget, economic development and labor issues.

Margolis, a resident of Manhattan died at age 78 on December 13, 2008 due to cardiac arrest. He is survived by Brian Margolis, Robert Margolis, Nancy King and seven grandchildren: Maximilian, Harry, Sophie, Delphine, Porter, Beatrice, and Gilberto.
