= Joseph Pulitzer House =

Mansion in Manhattan, New York

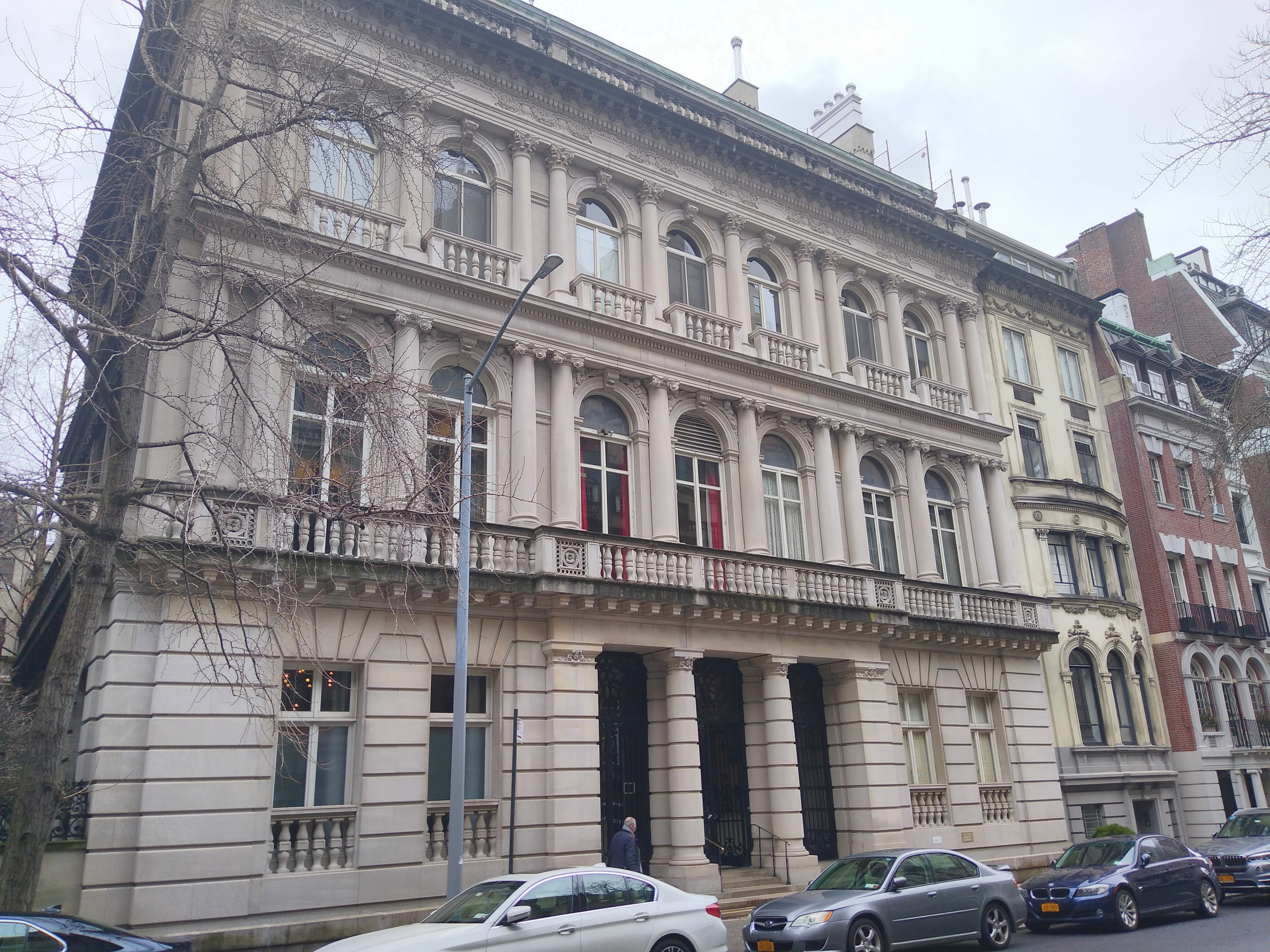
- Interactive map of the Joseph Pulitzer House area

General information
- Coordinates: 40.77283°N 73.96563°W

The Joseph Pulitzer House is a mansion at 7-11 East 73rd Street on the Upper East Side of Manhattan in New York City. It was designed by McKim, Mead & White and constructed for the family of Joseph Pulitzer, who lived there from 1904 to his death in 1911. The house remained in the family until 1934.

It was planned to be replaced with modern apartment houses in 1930 and again in 1952. The home was converted into 14 cooperative apartments in 1957.
