= John J. McCusker =

American economic historian (1939–2026)

John James McCusker II (August 12, 1939 – September 24, 2026) was an American economic historian who was the Ewing Halsell Distinguished Professor of American History and Professor of Economics at Trinity University, San Antonio, Texas.

== Early life and education ==
McCusker was born on August 12, 1939, in Rochester, New York, and grew up in upstate New York. He did graduate work at the University of Rochester, where he studied with Robert W. Fogel, the 1993 Nobel Laureate in Economic Science; at University College London, where he worked under Harry C. Allen; and at the University of Pittsburgh, where Carter Goodrich directed his doctoral dissertation, receiving his degree in 1970.

== Teaching career ==
McCusker taught at the University of Maryland, College Park for 24 years. In 1992, he moved to Texas, and taught at Trinity University until he retired in 2015. He offered courses in the general U.S. history, U.S. economic and business history, and the history of seventeenth and eighteenth century British America. In addition he served, in an honorary capacity, from 1994 as Adjunct Professor of early American History at the University of Texas, in Austin.

== Personal life and death ==
McCusker was married to Ann Van Pelt; they had five children: Terrie F. Conner, Kenneth W. Florance, John J. McCusker III, Patrick W. McCusker and Margaret E. McCusker.

McCusker died in San Antonio, Texas, on September 24, 2026, at the age of 87.

== Publications ==
- Money and Exchange in Europe and America, 1600-1775: A Handbook (1978; reissued with corrections, 1992) ISBN 978-0-8078-4367-3
- European Marine Lists and Bills of Entry: Early Commercial Publications and the Origins of the Business Press (1985)
- The Economy of British America, 1607-1789 (1985; 2nd ed., with a supplementary bibliography, 1991), co-authored with Russell Menard ISBN 978-0-8078-4351-2
- Rum and the American Revolution: The Rum Trade and the Balance of Payments of the Thirteen Continental Colonies (1989)
- The Beginnings of Commercial and Financial Journalism: The Commodity Price Currents, Exchange Rate Currents, and Money Currents of Early Modern Europe (1991), co-authored with Cora Gravesteijn
- How Much Is That in Real Money? A Historical Price Index for Use as a Deflator of Money Values in the Economy of the United States (1992; reprinted, 1993; 2nd ed., rev., 2001)
- Essays in the Economic History of the Atlantic World (1997) ISBN 978-0415168410
- Co-edited with Kenneth Morgan, The Early Modern Atlantic Economy (2001) ISBN 978-0521782494

The Economy of British America won two honors: the Outstanding Academic Book for 1985–1986 by Choice and a Distinguished Book Award, Honorable Mention, by the Society of Colonial Wars.
