= Sidney Dillon Ripley I =

American insurance executive

Sidney Dillon Ripley
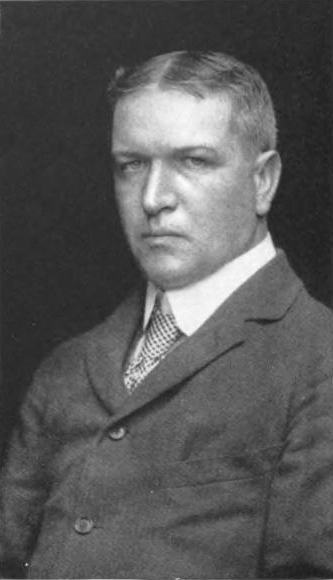
- Born: January 11, 1863
- Died: February 24, 1905 (aged 42)
- Occupation: Insurance executive
- Spouse: Mary Baldwin Hyde (m. 1885)
- Children: 4
- Parent(s): Josiah Dwight Ripley; Julia Elizabeth Dillon Ripley
- Relatives: Sidney Dillon (grandfather); Sidney Dillon Ripley (nephew)

Sidney Dillon Ripley (January 11, 1863 – February 24, 1905) was an American insurance executive and prominent member of New York society during the Gilded Age.

== Early life ==
He was the son of Josiah Dwight Ripley and Julia Elizabeth (née Dillon) Ripley. His younger brothers were Harry Dillon Ripley and Louis Arthur Dillon Ripley. One ancestor, William Ripley, came in 1638 with his wife, two sons, and two daughters from Hingham, Norfolk County, England, and settled in Hingham, Massachusetts. His paternal grandfather was Sidney Dillon, the financier and builder of the Union Pacific Railroad who served as its first president.

After his father's death, his mother remarried, to Gilman Smith Moulton on March 1, 1894.

After his grandfather died with an estate valued at $6 million, Dillon received bequests that gave him an annual income of $60,000 ($192,000 today).

== Career ==
Beginning in 1885, Ripley worked for The Equitable Life Assurance Society, eventually serving as the corporate treasurer and a director for 13 years. He also served as a director of the First National Bank of Hemstead, L.I., the Manganese Steele Safe Company, the Mercantile Trust Company, the Mount Morris Bank, and the Taylor Iron and Steel Company.

=== Society life ===
In 1892, Ripley and his wife were included in Ward McAllister's "Four Hundred", purported to be an index of New York's best families published in The New York Times. The number was the capacity of Mrs. Astor's ballroom. He was a member of the Meadow Brook Hunt Club, the Metropolitan Club, the Chamber of Commerce, the New York Zoological Society, the New York Mycological Society, the Coney Island Jockey Club, the University Club, the Lawyers' Club, the Racquet Club, the Country Club, the South Side Sportsmen's Club, the Rockaway Hunting Club, the Automobile Club and the Turf and Field Clubs.

=== Residences ===
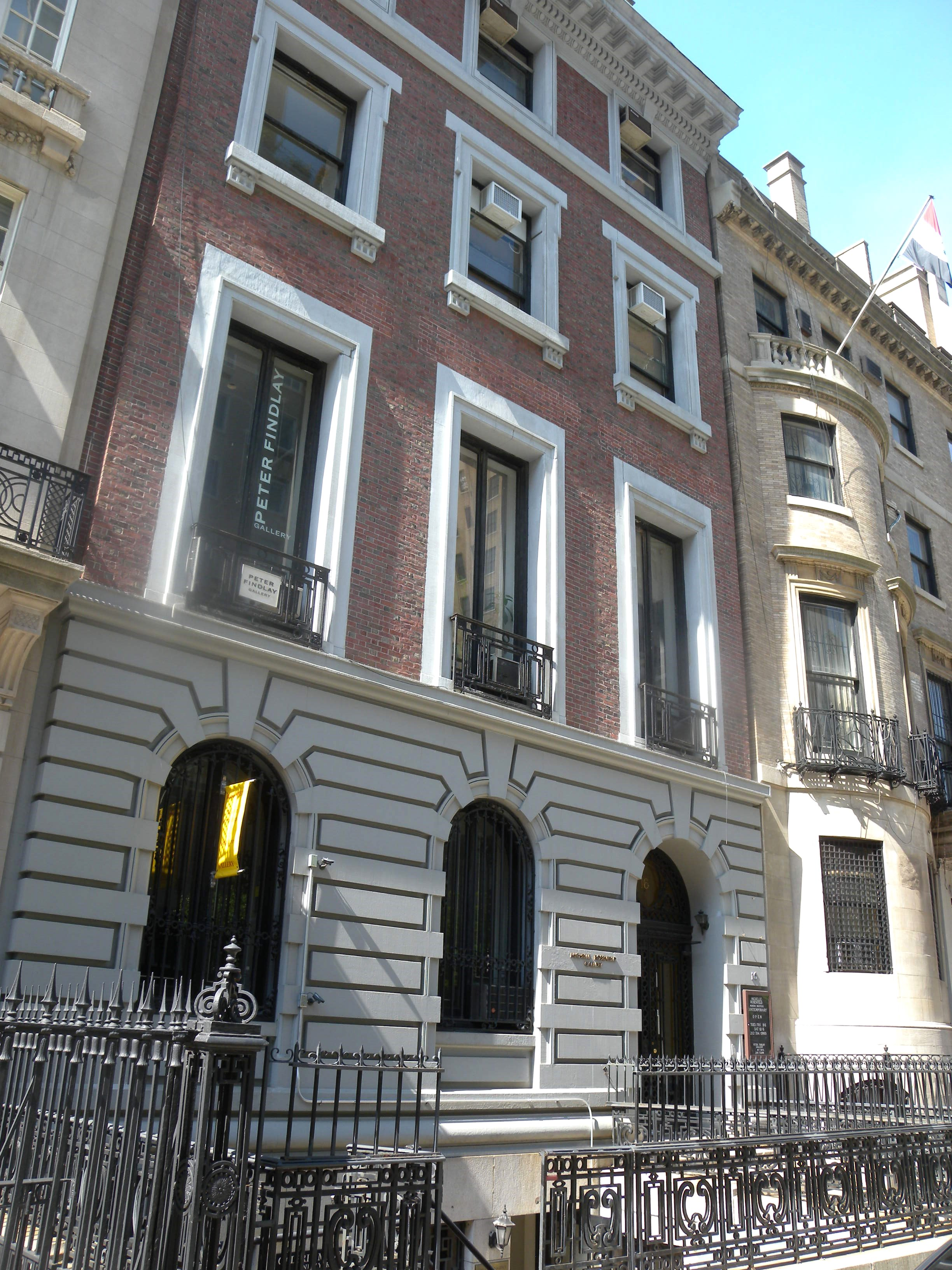
The Ripley's New York City home, 16 East 79th Street, designed by Warren & Wetmore.

The Ripley's had a 48-room country home in Hempstead on Long Island (which is today across from Hofstra University at California and Fulton Avenues), known as "Crossways."

In 1901, Ripley had commissioned Warren & Wetmore to build them a 35-foot-wide mansion in New York's Upper East Side at 16 East 79th Street. The five-story brick-and-limestone Georgian home, that had a columned portico and two-step porch, was completed shortly before his death in 1905. In 1912, his widow sold the house, which The New York Times said "occupies a plot 35 by 102.2 feet in the choicest upper Fifth Avenue residential section", for $400,000. She moved to 101 East 72nd Street.

In 1929, naval architect Lewis Nixon purchased the 79th Street mansion. Lewis is grandfather to Lewis Nixon III, a U.S. Army officer in "Easy" Company of the 506th Parachute Infantry Regiment of the 101st Airborne Division during World War II.

== Personal life ==
On October 14, 1885, Ripley was married to Mary Baldwin Hyde (1867–1938). Mary was the daughter of Henry Baldwin Hyde, the founder of Equitable Life Assurance, and Annie (née Fitch) Hyde, and the sister of James Hazen Hyde. Together, they were the parents of:

- Annah Dillon Ripley (1886–1963), who married Count Pierre Joseph de Viel Castel (1875–1950), a grandson of Count Horace de Viel-Castel, in 1910. They lived at 4 Avenue Marceau in Paris.
- Henry Baldwin Hyde Ripley (c. 1890–1959), who married Lesley Frederica Pearson, daughter of Commander Frederick Pearson and grand-niece of James Cook Ayer, in 1919.
- Sidney Dillon Ripley Jr. (1891–1970), a prominent real‐estate broker who married Betsy Ann Sherry.
- James Hazen Ripley (c. 1893–1977), who married Marguerite Doubleday (1901–1932) in 1925. After his first wife's death, he remarried to Gladys Livermore in 1934.

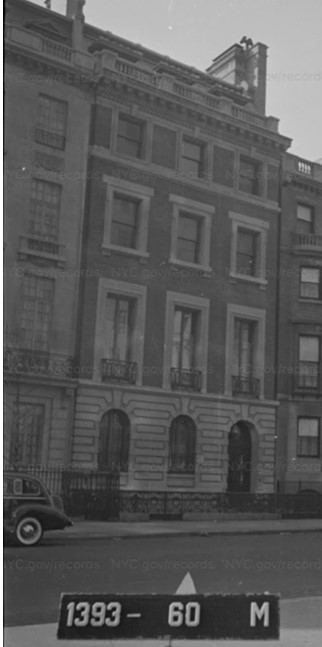
Ripley House at 16 East 79th Street in 1940s

In 1895, Ripley and James Lorillard Kernochan (son of James Powell Kernochan) were arrested in Hempstead for playing golf, on a Sunday, on the greens opposite the clubhouse at the Meadow Brook Hunt Club.

In 1899, he urged his brother, Harry Dillon Ripley, to take charge of his financial affairs after Hyde had run into debt of $100,000. Just before Ripley died, Harry sued Sidney and the Knickerbocker Trust Company alleging "misconduct in managing his property." After his death, the Supreme Court of New York Referee conducted an investigation and found that "the trust had been well and faithfully administered" and Sidney and the Knickerbocker Trust were exonerated and relieved of their duties.

Through brother Lous he is uncle to Forman School founder Julie Ripley Forman,

Through brother Lous, his nephew is Sidney Dillon Ripley II, an ornithologist who served as Secretary of the Smithsonian Institution for almost 20 years. He married Mary Livingston of the prominent Livingston family.

Through his daughter, he was the grandfather of Marie Bonne de Viel Castel (1914–1997), who married Eugene Bowie Roberts Jr. in 1965; (Note: Eugene Bowie Roberts Jr. was a son of Countess Cornelia "Gilia" Széchényi (1908–1958) and Eugene Bowie Roberts (1898–1983), heir of the Roberts family of Bowie, Maryland, and a grandson of Countess Gladys Vanderbilt Széchenyi and Count László Széchenyi.) Pierre Etienne de Viel Castel (1917–2012); and Édouard Louis de Viel Castel (1911–1968).

Through his son Henry, he was the grandfather of Henry Baldwin Hyde Ripley Jr. (1924–1998), who married Ethel Lachicotte Boyle, and Malcolm Pennington Ripley (1927–2005).

=== Death ===
Ripley died of appendicitis on February 24, 1905. His will was quickly probated and his estate, valued in excess of $5,000,000, was left to his family. His wife received their Long Island home, and all "jewelry, horses, carriages, and harness, and all property of the deceased for life." All of the funds in trust he inherited from his grandfather passed to his children. His wife received $848,505 and each of his children received $74,614 directly.

After his death, his widow remarried to Charles R. Scott, a Hong Kong-based British banker who was the son of Col. Robert Scott of the Irish Fusiliers, in Bar Harbor, Maine in 1912.
