= Four continents =

16th century division of the world

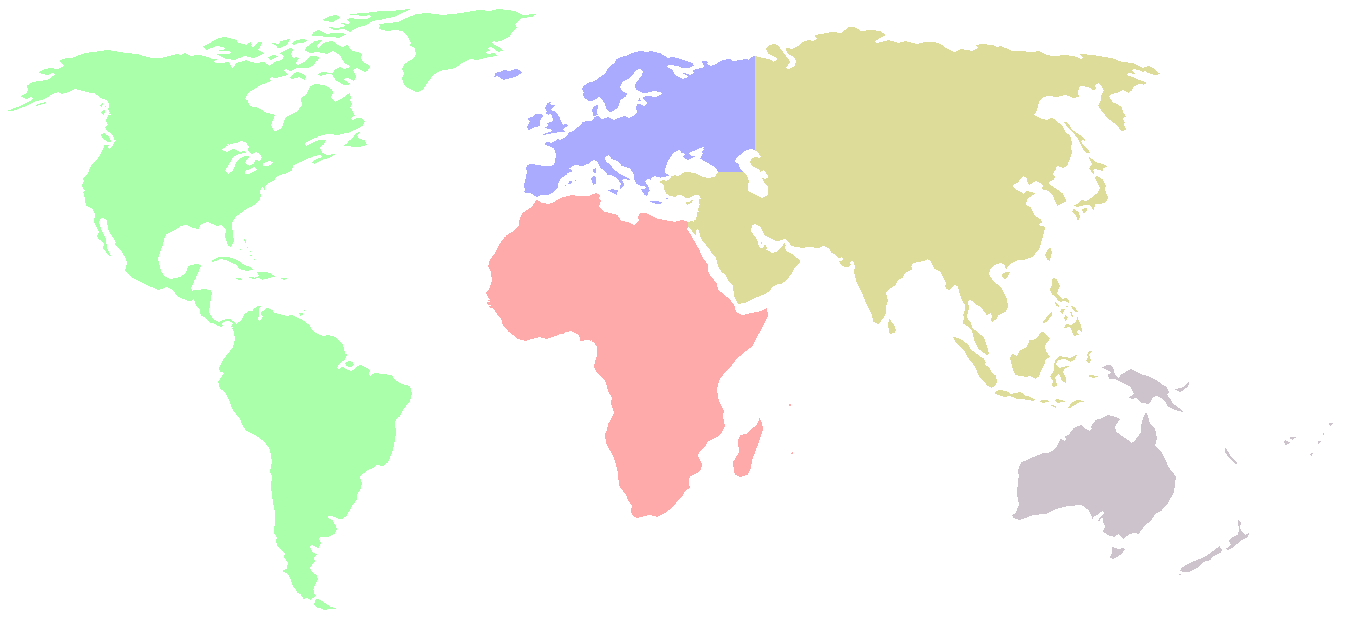
The four continents, plus Oceania, added later

Europeans in the 16th century divided the world into four continents: Africa, America, Asia, and Europe. Each of the four continents was seen to represent its quadrant of the world—Africa in the south, America in the west, Asia in the east, and Europe in the north. This division fit the Renaissance sensibilities of the time, which also divided the world into four seasons, four classical elements, four cardinal directions, four classical virtues, etc.

The four parts of the world or the four corners of the world refers to Africa (the "south"), America (the "west"), Asia (the "east"), and Europe (the "north").

Depictions of personifications of the four continents became popular in several media. Sets of four could be placed around all sorts of four-sided objects, or in pairs along the façade of a building with a central doorway. They were common subjects for prints, and later small porcelain figures. A set of loose conventions quickly arose as to the iconography of the figures. They were normally female, with Europe queenly and grandly dressed, Asia fully dressed but in an exotic style, with Africa and America at most half-dressed, and given exotic props as attributes.

== A three-cornered world ==
The ancient tripartite view of the observed known world

Before the discovery of the New World a commonplace of classical and medieval geography had been the "three parts" in which, from Mediterranean and European perspectives, the world was divided: Europe, Asia and Africa. As Laurent de Premierfait, the pre-eminent French translator of Latin literature in the early fifteenth century, informed his readers:

Asia is one of the three parts of the world, which the authors divide in Asia, Africa and Europe. Asia extends towards the Orient as far as the rising sun ("devers le souleil levant"), towards the south ("midi") it ends at the great sea, towards the occident it ends at our sea, and towards the north ("septentrion") it ends in the Maeotian marshes and the river named Thanaus.

== A fourth corner: the enlarged world ==
For Laurent's French readers, Asia ended at "our sea", the Mediterranean; Western Europeans were only dimly aware of the Ural Mountains, which divide Europe from Asia in the eyes of the modern geographer, and which represent the geological suture between two fragmentary continents, or cratons. Instead, the division between these continents in the European-centered picture was the Hellespont, which neatly separated Europe from Asia. From the European perspective, into the Age of Discovery, Asia began beyond the Hellespont with Asia Minor, where the Roman province of Asia had lain, and stretched away to what were initially unimaginably exotic and distant places— "the Orient".

== Iconography ==
=== Cesare Ripa's Iconologia ===
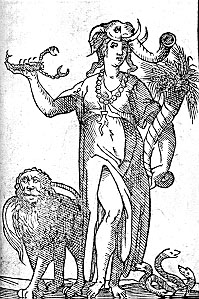
Africa

America

Asia

Europa

Woodcuts in Ripa's Iconologia (1603)

In 1593, Cesare Ripa published one of the most successful emblem books for the use of artists and artisans who might be called upon to depict allegorical figures. He covered an astonishingly wide variety of fields, and his work was reprinted many times, though the text did not always correlate to the illustration. The book was still being brought up-to-date in the 18th century. Ripa's text and the many sets of illustrations by various artists for different later editions (beginning in 1603) took some of the existing iconological conventions for the four continents, and were so influential that depictions for the next two centuries were largely determined by them.

Europa is depicted as a woman dressed in fine clothes. She wears a crown while the papal tiara and crowns of kings lie at her feet, indicating her position of power over all the continents. The plentiful cornucopia shows Europe to be a land of abundance and the small temple she holds signifies Christianity. As a continent of great military force, Europe is also accompanied by a horse and an array of weapons. This probably draws on the Europa regina map schematic.

Africa, by contrast wears the elephant headdress and is accompanied by animals common to Africa such as a lion, the scorpion of the desert sands, and Cleopatra's asps. These depictions come straight from Roman coins with personifications of the Roman province of Africa, a much smaller strip of the Mediterranean coast. The abundance and fertility of Africa is symbolized in the cornucopia that she holds. Other personifications of Africa at the time depict her nude, symbolizing the Eurocentric perceptions of Africa as an uncivilized land. While the illustration of Africa in Ripa's Iconologia is light-skinned, it was also common to illustrate her with dark skin.

Ripa's Asia, seen by Europe as a continent of exotic spices, silk, and the seat of Religion, wears rich clothing and carries a smoking censer. The continent's warm climate is represented by the wreath of flowers in her hair. A camel takes its ease beside her.

The iconic image of America shows a Native American maiden in a feathered headdress, with bow and arrow. Perhaps she represents a fabled Amazon from the river that already carried the name. In other instances of American iconography, symbols meant to connote wilderness and a tropical climate occasionally included animals entirely absent from the Americas, such as the lion. Flora and fauna as images were often interchangeable between depictions of Africa and America during the seventeenth century due to the association of the tropical climate of Central and South America with that of Africa.

In addition to having an untamed landscape, America was portrayed as a place of savagery by virtue of the people who inhabited it. This can be seen in the woodcut as America is depicted as much more warlike than the other three continents. As Claire Le Corbeiller explains, America "was usually envisioned as a rather fierce savage – only slightly removed in type from the medieval tradition of the wild man."

The woodcut also shows America stepping on a human head, which is meant to connote cannibalism. Evidence of dismemberment, such as disembodied heads, in addition to America's bow and arrows and her lack of clothing were all meant to connote savagery. Such imagery was not uncommon in depictions of the Americas, but it was not always the case. In time, the image of a wild native being justly subjugated by a European conqueror was turned into a portrayal of an "Indian princess".

=== Other depictions ===
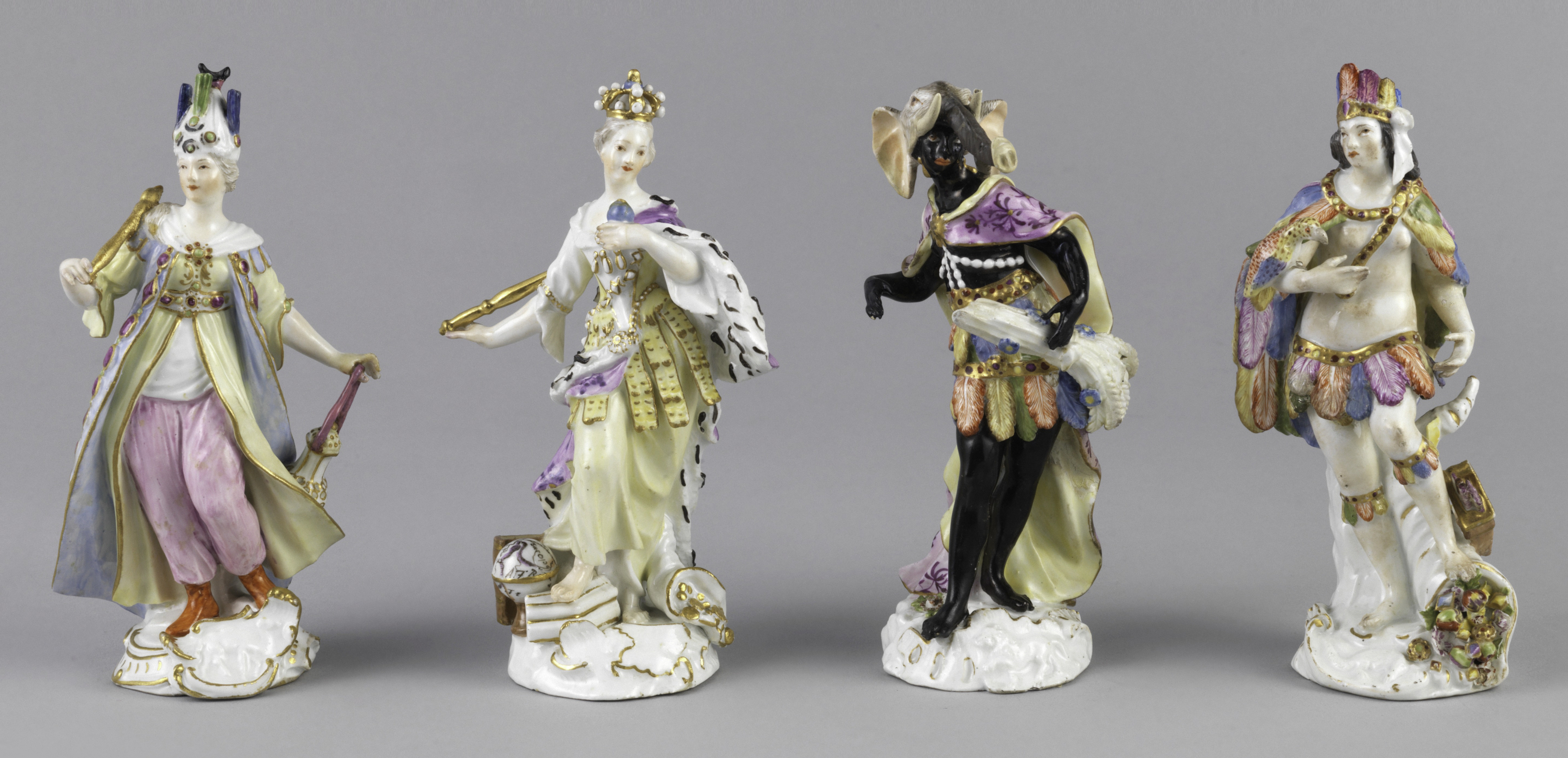
Set of porcelain figures, German, c. 1775, from left: Asia, Europe, Africa, America. Formerly James Hazen Hyde collection.

The American millionaire philanthropist James Hazen Hyde, who inherited a majority share in Equitable Life Assurance Society, formed a collection of allegorical prints illustrating the Four Continents that are now at the New-York Historical Society; Hyde's drawings and a supporting collection of sets of porcelain table ornaments and other decorative arts illustrating the Four Continents were shared by various New York City museums.

The Renaissance associated one major river to each of the continents; Europe is represented by the Danube, Africa and Asia by the Nile and the Ganges respectively, and America is represented by the La Plata. The Four Rivers theme appears for example in the Fontana dei Quattro Fiumi, a 17th-century fountain in Rome designed by Gian Lorenzo Bernini in the Piazza Navona in Rome, and in the painting The Four Continents by Peter Paul Rubens. Fountain of the Four Rivers, (Danube, Nile, Ganges, La Plata)

== Decline ==
With the European discovery of the existence of Australia, the theme of the "Four Continents" lost much of its drive, long before another continent, Antarctica, was also discovered. The iconography survived as the Four Corners of the World, however, generally in self-consciously classicizing contexts: for instance, in New York, in front of the Beaux-Arts Alexander Hamilton U.S. Custom House (1907), four sculptural groups by Daniel Chester French symbolize the "Four Corners of the World".

== Today ==
Continents have occasionally been grouped together by landmass. The four resulting continental landmasses are, from largest to smallest: Afroeurasia, America, Antarctica and Australia.

== See also ==
- Continent
- Four Corners (disambiguation)
- Four Seas
- Roof of the World
- Seven Seas
