= Sidney Dillon =

American businessman (1812–1892)

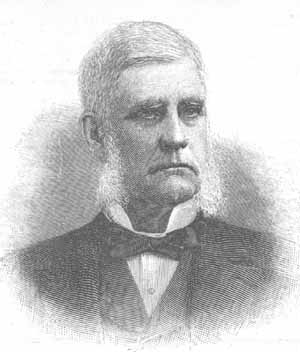
- Born: May 7, 1812; Northampton, New York, U.S.
- Died: June 9, 1892 (aged 80); Manhattan, New York, U.S.
- Occupations: Railroad builder & manager
- Spouse: Hannah Smith (m. 1841; died 1884)
- Children: 2

Sidney Dillon (May 7, 1812 – June 9, 1892) was an American railroad executive and one of the US's premier railroad builders.

== Early life ==
Dillon was born in Northampton, Fulton County, New York. His father, Timothy, was a farmer.

== Career ==
Sidney Dillon began his career in the industry working as a water boy on the Mohawk and Hudson Railroad, one of America's earliest railroads, for its construction from Albany to Schenectady, New York.

In 1840, he went into business for himself, forming his own construction company, and obtaining the construction contract for the Boston and Albany Railroad.

He was actively involved in the construction of numerous roads, his largest being the Union Pacific Railroad, with which he became actively involved in 1865 through an equity exchange with the Crédit Mobilier of America corporation.

Crédit Mobilier of America was a company set up by the Union Pacific to defraud United States taxpayers in the construction of the First transcontinental railroad. The result was the Crédit Mobilier of America scandal, which exposed an over-invoicing and a stock and bond share-pricing scheme, whereby Union Pacific officers and directors, including Dillon, profited by manipulating the share price of Crédit Mobilier of America's stock shares and bonds, padding invoices to the U.S. Government, and bribing congressmen with shares in Crédit Mobilier of America, cash and other perks.

As one of the principal contractors for the Union Pacific, Dillon's vast experience in the construction of railroads proved invaluable. He took part in the "golden spike" ceremony of the First Transcontinental Railroad in 1869, receiving one of the ceremonial silver spikes used to complete the project.

His spike was a blended iron, silver, and gold spike, supplied by the Arizona Territory, engraved: Ribbed with iron clad in silver and crowned with gold Arizona presents her offering to the enterprise that has banded a continent and dictated a pathway to commerce. This spike was given to Union Pacific president, Oliver Ames, following the ceremony. The spike was donated to the Museum of the City of New York Florence Dillon Wyckoff Whitney (1877-1960) in 1943. It was, for a time, on display at the Union Pacific Railroad Museum in Council Bluffs, Iowa. The Museum of the city of New York sold the spike in January 2023, via auction, to benefit other items in its collection. The winning bid totaled US$2.2 million

Following 1870, Dillon was primarily known as a financier, becoming involved with Jay Gould in numerous ventures as well as serving on the board of directors of the Western Union Telegraph Company. He finally served as President of the Union Pacific Railroad from 1874 to 1884, and again from 1890 until his death in 1892.

== Personal life ==
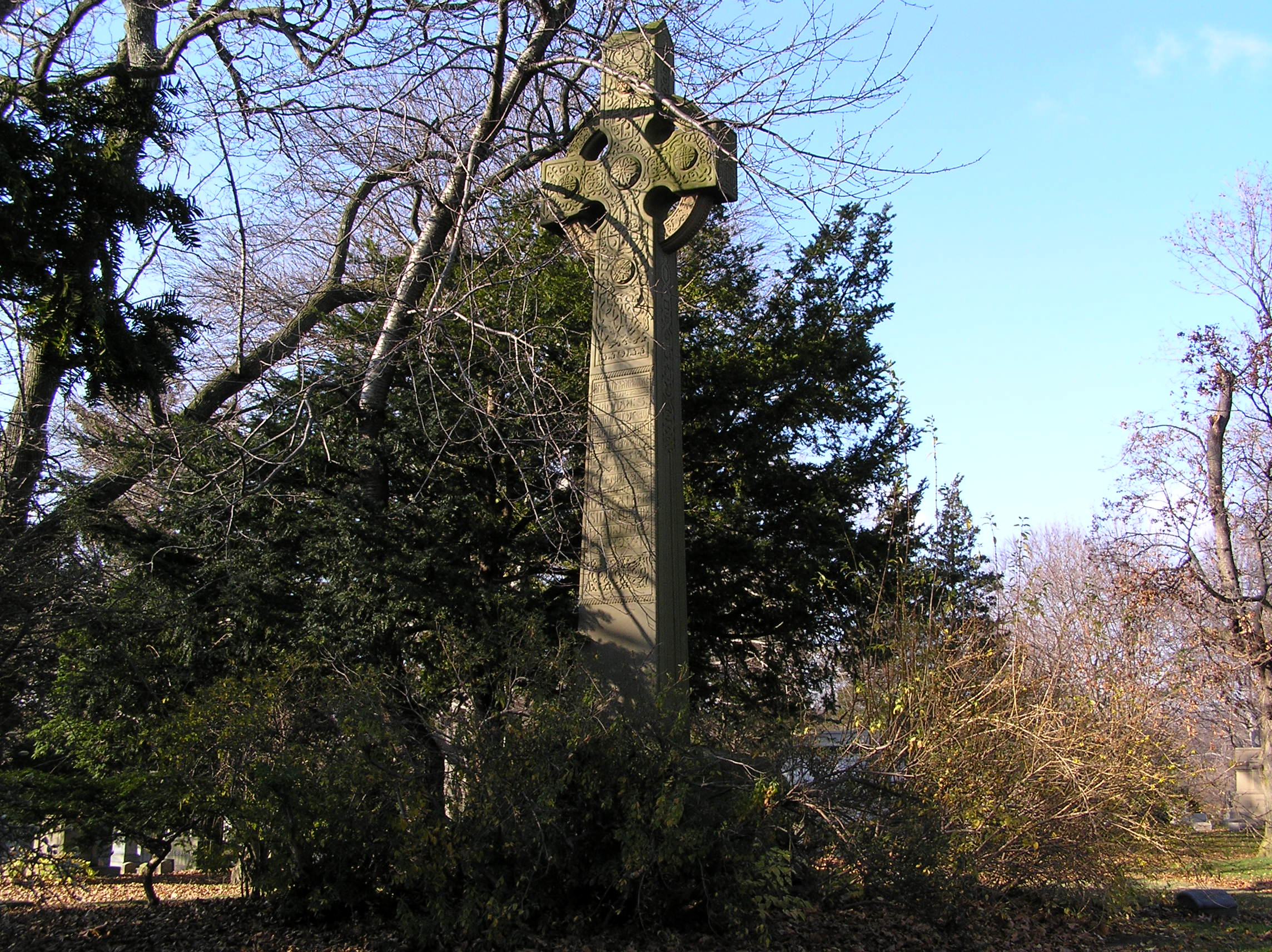
The monument of Sidney Dillon in Woodlawn Cemetery

In 1841, Dillon married Hannah Smith (1822–1884) of Amherst, Massachusetts. The couple had two daughters:.

- Cora A. Dillon, who married Dr. Peter B. Wyckoff in 1875.
- Julia E. ("Julie") Dillon, who married Josiah Dwight Ripley on May 28, 1862. After his death, she married Gilman Smith Moulton on March 1, 1894.

Dillon died at his home at 23 West 57th Street in New York City, after a twelve-week illness, at the age of 80. Funeral services were held at the Fifth Avenue Presbyterian Church (55th Street and 5th Avenue) on June 13. He is interred under a distinctive Celtic cross at Woodlawn Cemetery in Bronx, New York.

=== Descendants ===
Through his daughter Julia, he was the grandfather of Sidney Dillon Ripley I (1863–1905) and Louis Arthur Dillon Ripley (1878–1958), himself the father of Dillon's great-grandson Sidney Dillon Ripley II (1913–2001), a noted ornithologist, conservationist and Secretary of the Smithsonian Institution for twenty years.

== Legacy ==
- Dillon, Montana is named for him as it was an early terminus for the railroad.
- Sidney, Nebraska is also named for him.
- Nevada Central Railroad Engine #2 was named for him. The engine was later purchased by Ward Kimball, who named it the "Emma Nevada" and later donated it to the Southern California Railway Museum.

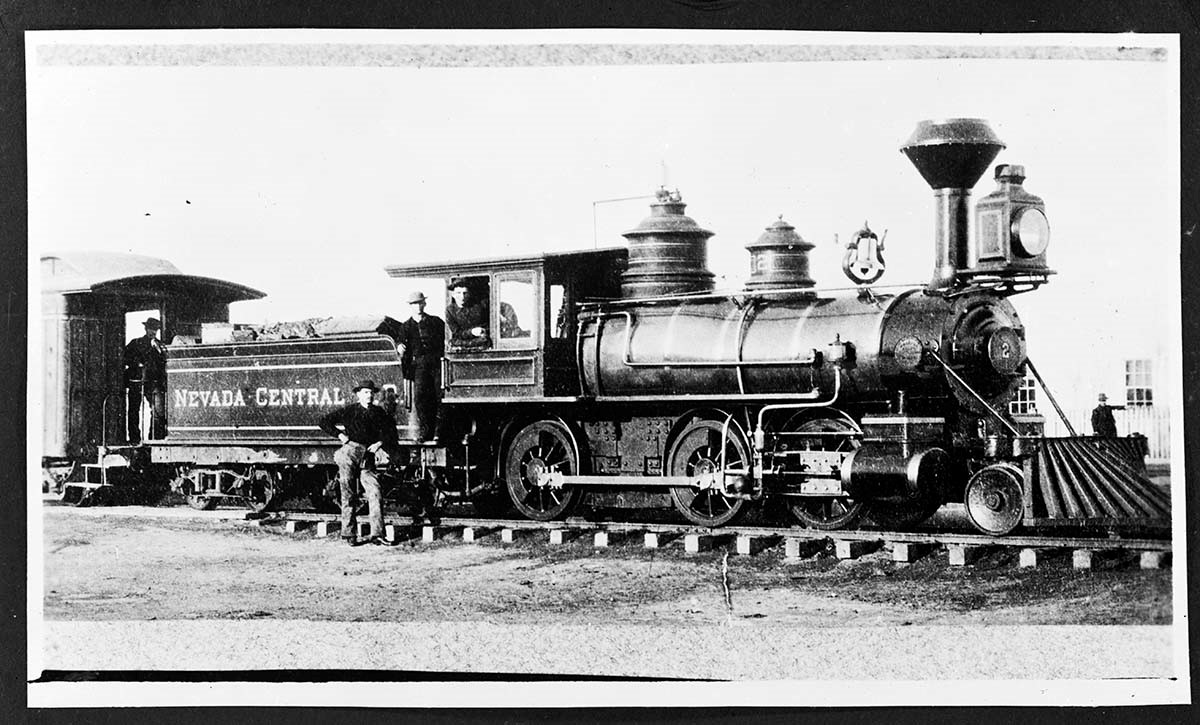
Nevada Central RR No. 2, the "Sidney Dillon," ca 1881. This engine is now the "Emma Nevada" at the Southern California Railway Museum.

== See also ==
- List of railroad executives

Business positions
Preceded by John Duff	President of Union Pacific Railroad; 1874 – 1884	Succeeded by Charles F. Adams
Preceded by Charles F. Adams	President of Union Pacific Railroad; 1890 – 1892	Succeeded by S.H.H. Clark
