= Henry Baldwin Hyde =

American businessman

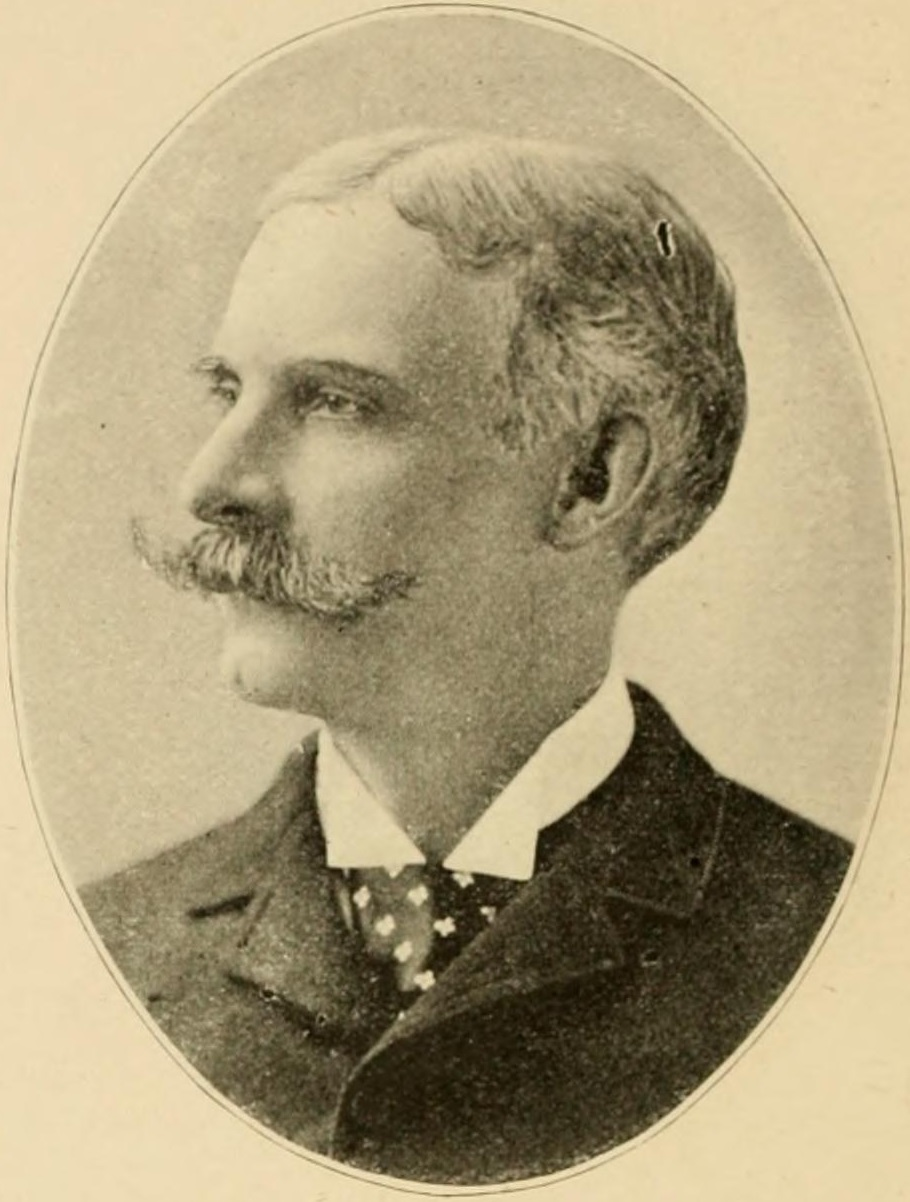
- Born: February 15, 1834; Catskill, New York, US
- Died: May 2, 1899 (aged 65); New York City, US
- Occupation: Insurance executive
- Known for: 1859 founded Equitable Life Assurance Society of the United States; 1868 introduced Tontine plan for life insurance
- Spouse: Annie Fitch (m. 1864)
- Children: James Hazen Hyde

Henry Baldwin Hyde (February 15, 1834& – May 2, 1899) was an American businessman. He is notable for having founded The Equitable Life Assurance Society of the United States in 1859. By the time of Hyde's death, The Equitable was the largest life insurance company in the world.

== Early life ==
Hyde was born in Catskill, New York, on February 15, 1834, the son of Henry Hazen Hyde, a successful merchant, and Lucy Baldwin (née Beach) Hyde. He attended the public schools of Catskill, and when he was 16 his teacher decided to move to New York City to join the growing life insurance industry. The teacher persuaded both Hydes to join him, and all three became agents for the Mutual Life Insurance Company of New York.

== Career ==
The younger Hyde worked for several months in Honesdale, Pennsylvania, before deciding to return to New York City, where he became a clerk for Merritt, Ely & Company, a dry goods import and wholesale company. He remained there for two years, and then returned to Mutual Life, where his father had recently been appointed to the executive ranks and a place on the board of directors. Hyde rose through the home office staff to become the company's cashier.

=== Equitable Life ===
In March 1859, Hyde left Mutual Life and established his own company, Equitable Life Assurance Society of the United States. William C. Alexander initially served as president, and Hyde was vice president and general manager. Hyde succeeded to the presidency after Alexander's death in 1874, and remained in the position until his death.

He led the company to construct the Equitable Life Assurance Building for its headquarters, completed on May 1, 1870, and pushed to have the first passenger elevators installed in what was then the tallest office building in the United States.

== Personal life ==
In 1864, he was married to Annie Fitch, a daughter of Capt. Martin Halenbeck Truesdell and Jane Maria (née Reed) Fitch. Together, they were the parents of:

- Anna Baldwin Hyde (1865–1865), who died in infancy.
- Mary Baldwin Hyde (1866–1938), who married Sidney Dillon Ripley in 1886. After his death in 1905, she married banker Charles R. Scott in 1912.
- Henry Baldwin Hyde (1872–1880), who died in childhood.
- James Hazen Hyde (1876—1959), who married Marthe Leishman (1882–1944), a daughter of John George Alexander Leishman and the widow of Count Louis de Gontaut-Biron.

He was a founding member of the Jekyll Island Club a.k.a. The Millionaires Club.

Hyde died at his home in New York City on May 2, 1899. His widow died in 1922.

=== Legacy ===
Hyde sought to guarantee that his son James Hazen Hyde would continue the family's control of the company after his death. The younger Hyde was appointed a vice president of the company at 22, and was 23 when he inherited a majority interest in the company. By the terms of his father's will, he was scheduled to assume the company presidency in 1906, but a concerted effort against him by the current president and several members of the board of directors led James H. Hyde to leave the company and move to France.

Through his son, he was a grandfather of Henry Baldwin Hyde (1915–1997), who married Marie de La Grange, a daughter of Baron Amaury De La Grange and Emily Eleanor, Baroness De La Grange (daughter of Henry T. Sloane), in 1941. Marie's brother was Henry-Louis de La Grange, a musicologist and biographer of Gustav Mahler.
