= S. H. H. Clark =

American railroad executive (1836–1900)

Silas H. H. Clark
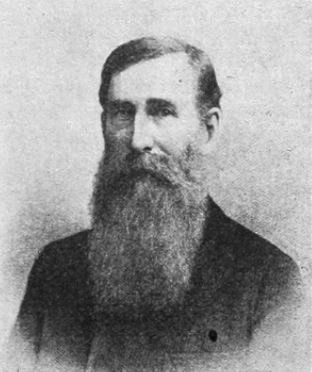
- Born: October 17, 1836; Morristown, New Jersey
- Died: June 1, 1900 (aged 63); Asheville, North Carolina
- Occupation: Railroad executive

Silas Henry Harrison Clark (October 17, 1836 – June 1, 1900) was an American railroad executive. Clark is best remembered as the President of the Union Pacific and Missouri Pacific Railroads during the decade of the 1890s.

== Biography ==
=== Early years ===
Silas H. H. Clark was born in Morristown, New Jersey in 1836 to Silas Condict Clark and Nancy Ianson Clark.

=== Career development ===
Clark first began to work in the railway industry as a railroad conductor on the New Jersey Central Railroad. He moved to the Union Pacific Railroad in 1867 and rose through the ranks to eventually become its general manager, working on behalf of wealthy financier Jay Gould, who controlled the line. Clark retained this position until resigning in the summer of 1884.

In November 1886, Clark was appointed 1st Vice President and General Manager of the Missouri Pacific Railroad, a road also controlled by Gould. He would remain in that position until March 1893. He was also named the General Manager of the Union Pacific in December 1890, holding this dual post until February 1, 1893.

=== Railroad presidency ===
On April 27, 1892, Clark was named President of the Union Pacific, replacing the recently deceased Sidney Dillon. He resigned this position on March 27, 1893, to take the job as President of the Missouri Pacific.

The Union Pacific found itself in financial trouble in 1893 and was placed under receivership. On October 13, 1893, Clark was named as one of the receivers of the road. Clark resigned his place as President of the Missouri Pacific to devote himself full time to the management of the Union Pacific.

=== Death and legacy ===
During the last few years of the 1890s, Clark's health began to fail. He died on June 1, 1900, at his residence in Asheville, North Carolina. His body was transferred by rail to Omaha, Nebraska for interment.
