= Yvonne Garrick =

French actress (born 1875)

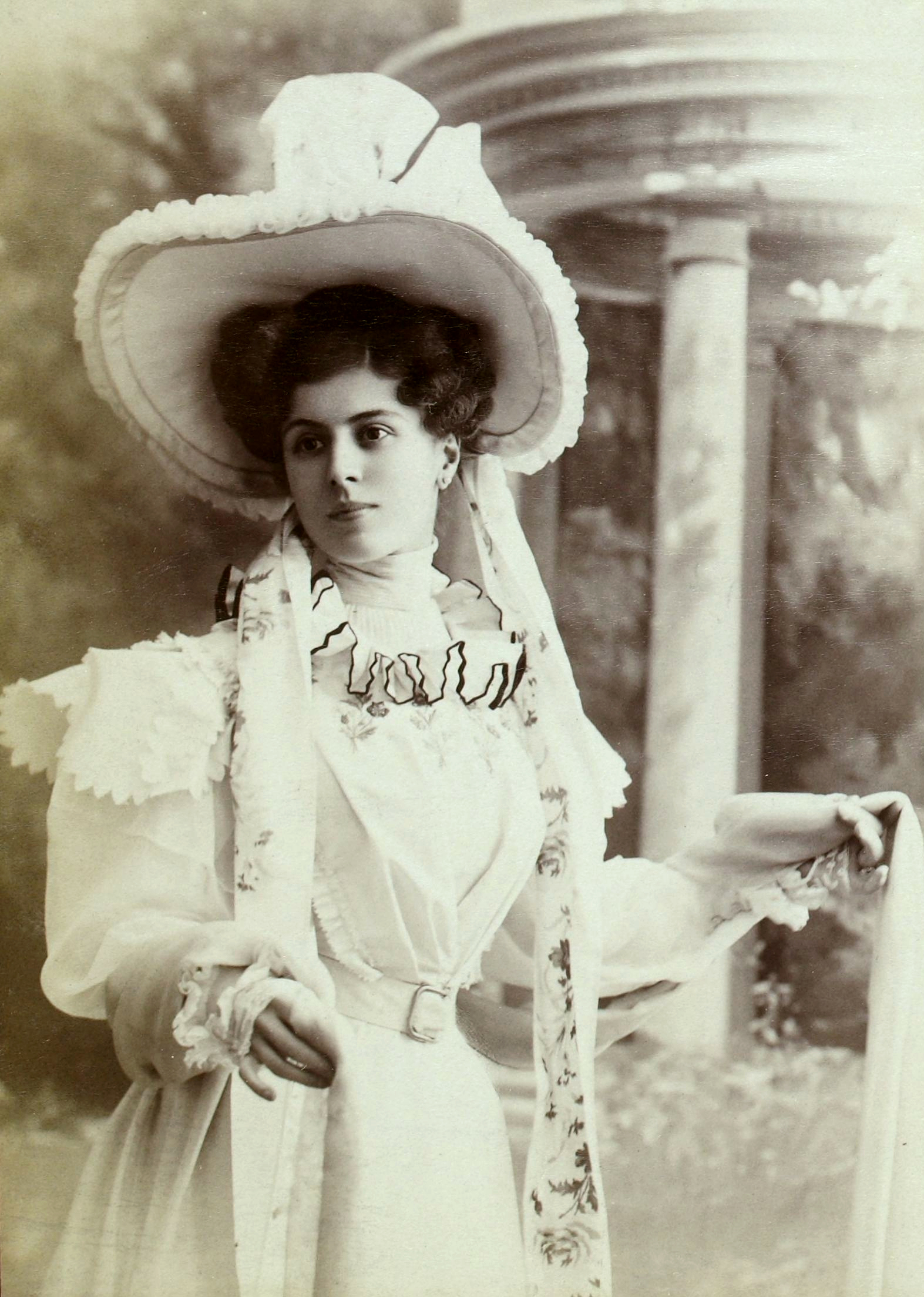
Yvonne Garrick, by Jean Reutlinger

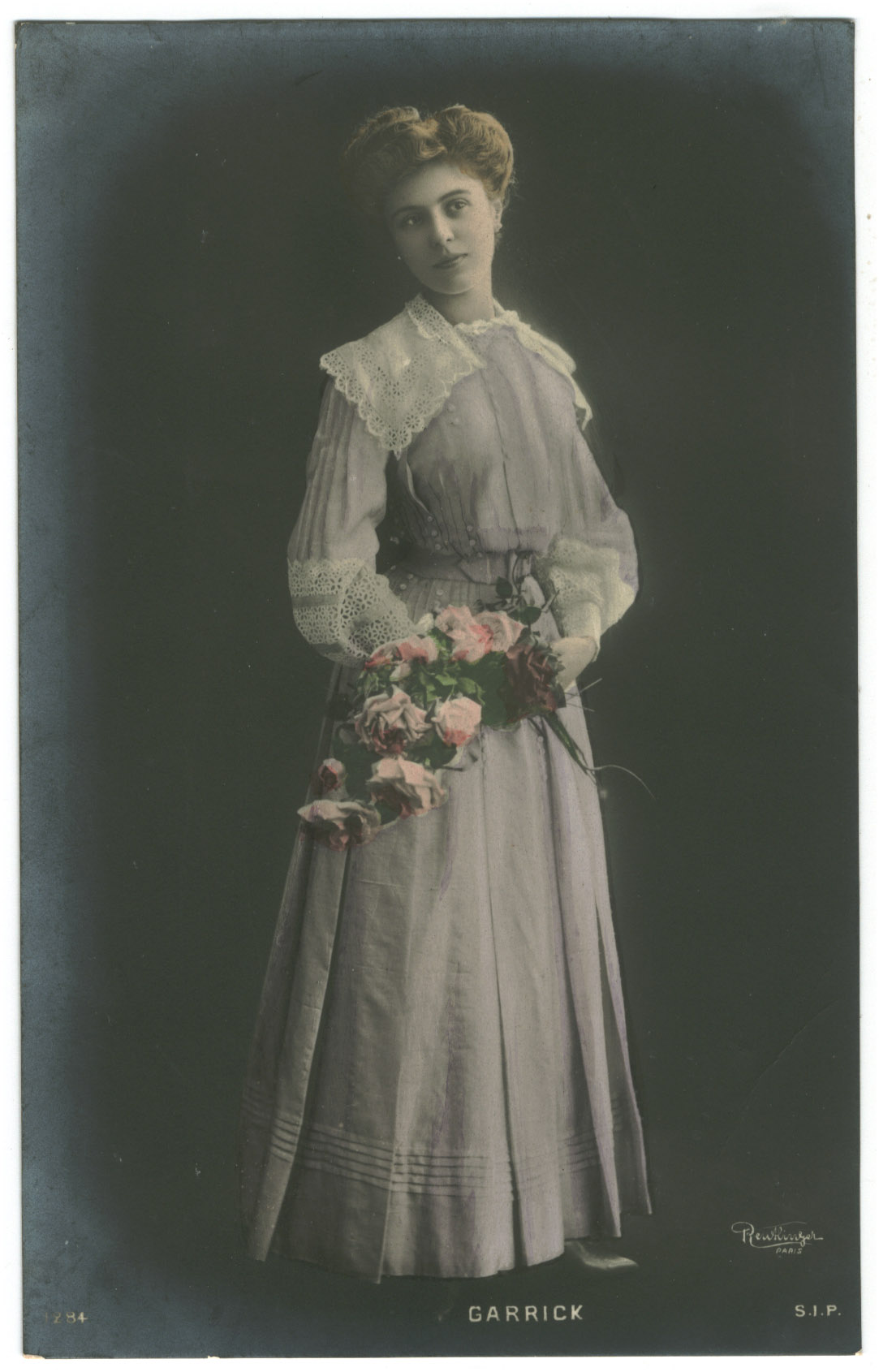
Yvonne Garrick, by Léopold-Émile Reutlinger

Yvonne Garrick (born 25 July 1875) was a French stage actress.

== Early life ==
Yvonne Garrick was born Eugénie Marie Louise Garchery at Charolles. She studied acting with Maurice de Féraudy at the Conservatoire de Paris. She won the highest prize among female students when she graduated from the Conservatoire in 1900.

== Career ==
=== In Paris ===
Garrick was a new actress when she appeared in Château Historique in 1900 at the Theatre National de l'Odéon. She played the title role in Psyche, and appeared in Le Mariage de Figaro, Colinette, and La Nuit de Mai, at the Odéon, all in 1901. Garrick appeared in Le Luxe des Autres at the Odéon in 1902.With the Comédie-Française in 1905, she played Jessica in Shylock, ou le Marchand de Venice. She played the title role in Jeanne Qui Rit at the Théatre Rejane in 1908. In 1909, back at the Odéon, she starred in Le Poussin. She starred in Edouard Pailleron's comedy Le Monde où l'on s'ennuie with the Comédie Francaise, and she returned to that show to the United States.

=== In North America ===
Garrick's New York debut came in 1915, in the farce Mon Ami Teddy. She reprised her role in Le Monde où l'on s'ennuie and was also in Arsène Lupin and La Sacrifiee, all at New York's Theatre Francais in the spring of 1916. In 1919, she starred in Frou Frou in Montréal, and in Le Gendre de M. Poirier at the Theatre du Vieux Columbier; and she was in a company at the Lenox Little Theater. In 1920, Garrick toured the United States in three short plays, opposite Belgian actor Carlo Liten; she also appeared in Musk on Broadway that year. In 1921 she gave a recitation at a reception for French ambassador Jean Jules Jusserand given by the Cercle Rochambeau in New York.

=== World War I benefit performances ===
In January 1916, Garrick was part of a group of actresses and writers to read letters from Edith Wharton's The Book of the Homeless, at a fundraising event for war relief causes, at art gallery in New York. She was on the programs of wartime benefit shows in 1918, including a concert for Secours Franco-Americain at the Ritz-Carlton and a Lake Placid, NY fundraiser for the American Friends of Musicians in France, as well as singing in Le Petit Abbé, a one-act opera by Charles Grisart at the Metropolitan Opera, which also featured Enrico Caruso and Frances Alda.

== Personal life ==
There were published rumors that Garrick would marry wealthy American James Hazen Hyde in 1906. A photograph in the Library of Congress shows her as "Yvonne Garrick Garchery" in the 1910s.
