= Armstrong investigation =

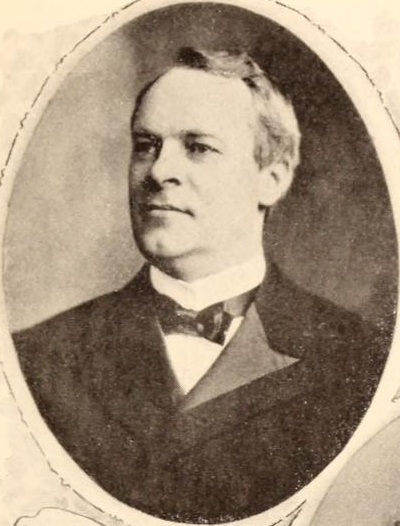
William Armstrong, who spearheaded the investigation

The Armstrong Committee, formally the Joint Committee of the Senate and Assembly of the State of New York to Investigate and Examine into the Business and Affairs of Life Insurance Companies Doing Business in the State of New York was a committee established by the New York State Legislature in late 1905 to investigate life insurance companies operating in New York. The investigation culminated in a report which highlighted questionable practices in the insurance industry, and made several recommendations of changes to be made. The committee conducted 51 investigatory sessions and its recommendations were incorporated into eight New York State statutes.

One recommendation adopted in New York and several other states was a restriction on policies with lengthy deferred payouts, including the 19th-century version of tontines. A prohibition on political campaign contributions by such corporations was also recommended.

The committee is credited with launching the political career of Charles Evans Hughes.

== Background ==
In the decades prior to the Armstrong investigation, the insurance industry had expanded considerably in the United States. Over the period 1865–1895, the total annual income of the insurance industry grew from $25 million to $642 million.

One of the largest insurance companies in the United States at the time, The Equitable Life Assurance Society of the United States, had over $1 billion in assets around 1900. After continued elaborate activities by the executives at the company, allegations of corruption occurred. An investigation by the New York Insurance Department began after an accumulation of complaints by consumers and other insurers, and was catalyzed by rumors that James Hazen Hyde, a vice president and expected next corporate president of The Equitable Life Assurance Society of the United States, had charged the expense of an immense costume ball that year to the corporate account. The investigation uncovered a series of corrupt practices used by the company. The report came to the conclusion that "A cancer can not be cured by treating the symptoms. Complete mutualization, to be paid for at a price only commensurate with its dividends is, in my opinion, the only sure measure of relief."

The findings led to the creation of the Armstrong Commission to investigate such practices across the industry. Spearheaded by William Armstrong, a state senator, the commission began work in 1905.

== See also ==
- Insurance in the United States
- Insurance regulatory law

== Sources ==
- Ransom, Roger L.; Sutch, Richard (June 1987). "Tontine Insurance and the Armstrong Investigation: A Case of Stifled Innovation, 1868-1905". The Journal of Economic History. 47 (2): 379–390. doi:10.1017/S0022050700048130. OCLC 848874732.
