= Four corners of the world =

Religious concept and artistic theme

The astronomical symbol of Earth represents either the four quadrants of the world or the four continents.

Several cosmological and mythological systems portray four corners of the world or four quarters of the world corresponding approximately to the four points of the compass (or the two solstices and two equinoxes). At the center may lie a sacred mountain, garden, world tree, or other beginning-point of creation. Often four rivers run to the four corners of the world, and water or irrigate the four quadrants of Earth.

== Ancient near eastern traditions ==
In Mesopotamian cosmology, four rivers flowing out of the garden of creation, which is the center of the world, define the four corners of the world. From the point of view of the Akkadians, the northern geographical horizon was marked by Subartu, the west by Mar.tu, the east by Elam and the south by Sumer; later rulers of all of Mesopotamia, such as Cyrus, claimed among their titles LUGAL kib-ra-a-ti er-bé-et-tì, "King of the Four Corners".

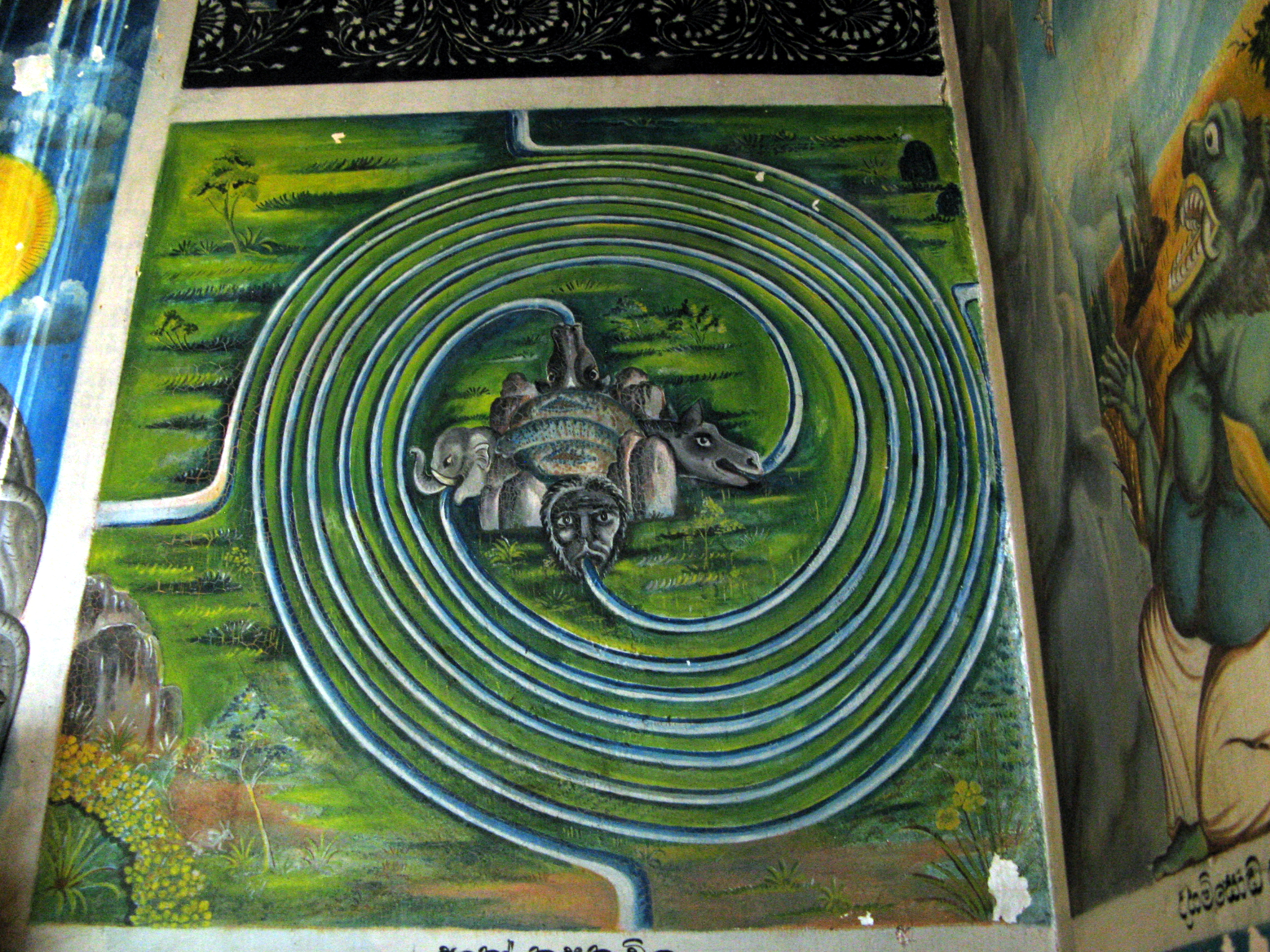
Tibetan conception of four rivers dividing the world into quadrants

== Semitic traditions ==
In Christianity and Judaism, the Old Testament (Book of Genesis, Genesis 2:8–14) identifies the Garden of Eden, and the four rivers as the Tigris, Euphrates, Pishon, and Gihon. The Tigris runs to Assyria, the Euphrates to Armenia, the Pishon to Havilah or Elam, and the Gihon to Ethiopia.

In the New Testament, the four corners of the earth are also spoken of in the Book of Revelation 7:1, and mention of the four quarters or corners of the earth appears in Revelation 20:8.

== Indian traditions ==
In Hinduism, the sacred mountain Kailash has four sides, from which four rivers flow to the four quarters of the world (the Ganges, Indus, Oxus (Amu Darya), and Śita (Tarim)), dividing the world into four quadrants. Another account portrays a celestial mountain, Mount Meru, buttressed by four terrestrial mountain ranges which extend in four directions. Between them lie four sacred lakes, through which the celestial river divides into four earthly rivers, which flow to the four corners and irrigate the four quadrants of the Earth. Buddhism and the Bon religion of Tibet have similar accounts.

Another similar account from Jain cosmology features a model of the universe with the world of humans located in the middle. Mount Meru is shown on the central continent Jambudvīpa which is surrounded by a series of concentric continents and oceans bordered by a serrated ring marking the mountain range beyond which humans cannot travel. Past this boundary in the four corners of the world are four temples enshrining Jinas, flanked by celebrants and celestial attendants.

== See also ==
- Four continents
- Biblical cosmology
- Flat Earth
- Time Cube
