= Equitable Life Building (Manhattan) =

Former building in Manhattan, New York

Equitable Life Assurance Building
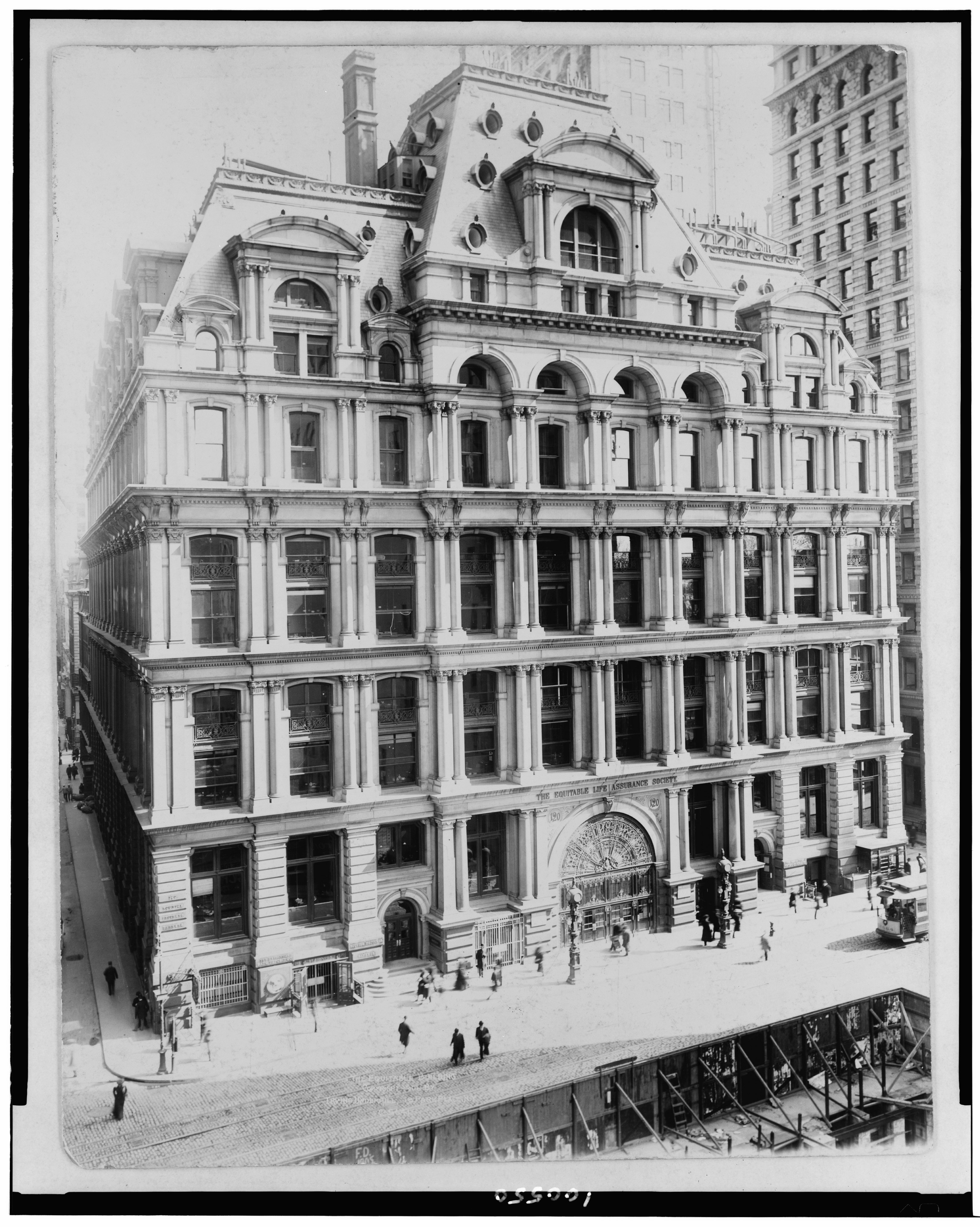
- Circa 1906
- Interactive map of the Equitable Life Assurance Building area

General information
- Status: Destroyed
- Type: Commercial offices
- Location: 120 Broadway; New York City; United States
- Coordinates: 40°42′30″N 74°00′38″W
- Construction started: 1868
- Completed: May 1, 1870
- Destroyed: January 9, 1912

Height
- Roof: approx. 130 ft (40 m) to 142 ft (43 m) (As first completed); 155 ft (47 m) (As expanded in 1885); 172 ft (52 m) (Final height)

Technical details
- Floor count: 9
- Lifts/elevators: 10

Design and construction
- Architects: Arthur Gilman; Edward H. Kendall
- Structural engineer: George B. Post
- Main contractor: David H. King Jr. (expansion)

The Equitable Life Assurance Building, also known as the Equitable Life Building, was the headquarters of the Equitable Life Assurance Society of the United States, at 120 Broadway in Manhattan, New York. Arthur Gilman and Edward H. Kendall designed the building, with George B. Post as a consulting engineer. The Equitable Life Building was made of brick, granite, and iron, and was originally built with seven above-ground stories and two basement levels, with a height of at least 130 feet (40 m). An expansion in 1885 brought the total height to 155 feet (47 m) and nine stories.

Construction began in 1868 and was completed in 1870 under the leadership of Equitable's president Henry Baldwin Hyde. It was the world's first office building to feature passenger elevators and consequently became successful attracting tenants. The Equitable Life Building was expanded numerous times; after the construction of annexes during the late 1880s, the building occupied its entire block, bounded by Broadway and Cedar, Pine and Nassau streets. Although it was advertised as fireproof, the Equitable Life Building was destroyed in a 1912 fire that killed six people. The 40-story Equitable Building was completed on the site in 1915.

== Architecture ==
Arthur Gilman and Edward H. Kendall designed the Equitable Life Building, with George B. Post as a consulting engineer. The building occupied the entire block bordered by Broadway to the west, Cedar Street to the north, Nassau Street to the east, and Pine Street to the south. The Equitable Life Building was made of brick, granite, and iron, and was originally built with seven above-ground stories and two basement levels. This count excluded a pavilion in the mansard roof above the seventh story, which would have counted as an eighth floor.

Accounts differ on the building's height at the time of its completion, with a cited height figure of 142 feet (43 m). According to a contemporary article in The New York Times, the Equitable Life Building was at least 130 feet (40 m) tall. Architect Robert A. M. Stern wrote that was likely the actual height based on a "convincing analysis" by architectural writer Lee Edward Gray. An expansion in 1885 brought the total height to 155 feet (47 m) and nine stories. Up to five separate structures made up the building. Its final height may have been 172 feet (52 m).

The building was touted as fireproof, with innovative features such as elevators and electric lighting. With an ornate arcade, it was described as a predecessor to 20th-century edifices that functioned as "micro-cities".

=== Facade ===
At Post's suggestion, a structural system of stone was used on the ground story, while brick and terracotta were used on the upper stories. The base was made of "darkish" granite from Quincy, Massachusetts, while the upper stories were clad with lighter granite from Concord, New Hampshire. Behind the granite cladding were walls made of hard-burnt brick from the North River; this brick was also used for party walls and partitions.

As built, the articulation of the second and third stories was designed as if they were a single story, and a similar architectural treatment was used for the fourth and fifth floors. Cornices separated these horizontal groupings, but there was no horizontal separation between the second/third and fourth/fifth floors, leading some observers to describe the Equitable Life Building erroneously as five stories. Rather, the double-story sections contained windows measuring 9 by 17 feet (2.7 by 5.2 m). Vertical piers with paired columns separated the windows.

=== Features ===
==== Interior ====
Equitable leased the basement and first floor to banks, taking the second and third floors for its own offices; commercial tenants leased the remaining floors. The Equitable offices featured the world's "most complete and imposing business hall", a domed clerking hall measuring 35 by 100 feet (11 by 30 m) and supported by twelve marble-clad Corinthian columns. Also within the Equitable Life Building were two raised skylights at the top of the 26-foot-high (7.9 m) ceiling. On the second floor a marble counter enclosed a workspace for 120 or 150 clerks. The offices of 40 officers and agents ran along the periphery of the workroom. A gallery enclosed three sides of the third floor, accessed from a spiral staircase in a corner of the second floor office of Henry Baldwin Hyde, founder of the Equitable Life Assurance Society.

Since Equitable occupied the second and third floors, which were seen as relatively unappealing, it could rent out the more desirable quarters in the basements, ground floor, and upper floors. The ground floor and the raised upper basement had banking rooms. Three of the banking rooms had marble floors, as did the entrance hall. When the building was renovated in the late 1880s, the lobby was expanded to stretch the entire block from Broadway to Nassau Street. The enlarged lobby was composed of a 44-foot-wide (13 m), 100-foot-long (30 m) arcade lined with convenience shops, post office boxes, a restaurant, and a barber. The arcade also included a barrel-vaulted ceiling with skylights, as well as a mosaic by the Herter Brothers; one critic described the arcade as a "marvel of the architect's and builder's art", in that respect superseding the nearby 280 Broadway, a grand Italianate department-store building nearby. Also in the lobby was the Cafe Savarin, a French-cuisine eatery on the Pine Street side of the building. A cross-passage stretched from Cedar to Pine Streets.

The fourth through sixth floors had 50 offices, which were occupied almost exclusively by lawyers. There was also a law library with nearly 40,000 volumes, as well as a separate insurance library with 8,000 volumes. Prior to the late 1880s, the seventh floor contained suites for the building's janitorial staff; after the renovation, the seventh and eighth floors were furnished with offices, similar to the fourth through sixth floors. There were also three dining rooms in the Equitable Life Building.

==== Mechanical and structural features ====
The Equitable Life Building was the first office building in the world to feature passenger elevators, with hydraulic elevators made by the Otis Elevator Company. Before the structure's completion, there were three elevators in the city—one each at the Astor House, the Fifth Avenue Hotel, and a private apartment building; office building heights had never exceeded four stories. Hyde had been advised against constructing elevators; at the time, prestigious firms did not rent offices above the second floor, since that entailed climbing more flights of stairs, exhausting the workers. Initially, the Equitable Life Building had two steam elevators, but four more were added during the mid-1870s. Four additional elevators were installed in the late 1880s, bringing the elevator count to 10. The elevators and the views from the top floors attracted thousands of passersby.

In addition to the elevators, the Equitable Life Building had other amenities like electric lighting. After expansion in 1887, the building had nine steel boilers and three hydraulic pumping engines that could pump 7,500 U.S. gallons (28,000 L) per minute, and a 400 horsepower (300 kW) engine that powered the lighting fixtures. Securities were stored in a welded-chrome and Bessemer steel vault above the Broadway entrance, which was built in 1899–1900. The vault had the latest security systems, including 9-short-ton (8.0-long-ton; 8.2 t) doors and time locks.

The Equitable Life Building was one of the first buildings in the city to use iron floor beams, and exposed iron was common throughout the interior of the building. While touted as fireproof, the Equitable Life Building still contained combustible components and non-fireproof materials. The floors were made of wood atop brick- or hollow-tile arches; in turn, the arches were located between the I-beams, which were made of iron and steel. The undersides of the arches were composed of metal lath and plaster, which were used to flatten the ceilings. Partitions were made of angle-iron studs, covered with metal lath and plaster. In the 1887 annex, the floors were of hollow burnt-clay flat arches set between iron beams, and the partitions were made of burnt clay blocks. The roof was made of wood and slate.

Dumbwaiters in the tile shaft had wooden doors and platforms, while the rest of the building had massive hardwood trim, wooden window sash, and wood-and-glass partitions that were ineffective against fire. The Equitable Life Building also had no automatic sprinklers or chemical extinguishers. The storage vaults were fireproof and survived the 1912 fire.

=== Artwork ===
The sculptor John Quincy Adams Ward was hired to produce Protection, a group of statues for the facade of the Equitable Life Building. Ward carved a group that resembled a vignette used on Equitable's insurance policies. Because of defects in the first carving, Ward commissioned a second carving weighing 10 short tons (8.9 long tons; 9.1 t), which was made from one block of marble. The final carving depicted a goddess protecting a widow. This sculptural group was carved in Italy and was unveiled when Grand Duke Alexei Alexandrovich of Russia traveled to the United States in 1871. Badly corroded by rain, it was removed in 1886–1887. The heads survived removal and passed through various owners.

Ward's statue commemorating Hyde was unveiled in 1901. It was placed in the building's corridor. The statue survived the fire that burned down the building. Other statues lined the other halls and stairs in the building.

The Herter Brothers mosaic in the lobby was described as being "the largest in America" when it was completed in 1887. The mural was composed of a draped woman with two draped children, flanked by nude figures of Greek warriors.

== History ==
When Equitable was founded in 1859, the company's first "home office" was located at 98 Broadway, in the same building as Hyde's previous employers, the Mutual Life Insurance Company of New York. American life insurance had begun "to take on the properties of an important institution" according to the National Park Service, and life insurance firms were some of the first companies to build high-profile skyscrapers. Further, many firms in the Financial District were building to the north of Wall Street, the traditional center of commerce in the neighborhood. Hyde was a member of the Fifth Avenue Presbyterian Church, which helped contribute funding to get Equitable started. William C. Alexander, brother of the church's pastor James Waddel Alexander, was Equitable's first president.

The company grew quickly and moved to 92 Broadway in December 1859; at the time, Equitable had $1.14 million of insurance in force (equal to $32 million in 2024). Initially, Equitable occupied four rooms on the second floor, but by 1862, they leased additional space on the third floor. In the mid-1860s Equitable leased more space at 94 and 96 Broadway owned by different landlords. By 1867, Equitable had $82.5 million of insurance in force (equal to $1.275 billion in 2024).

=== Planning and construction ===
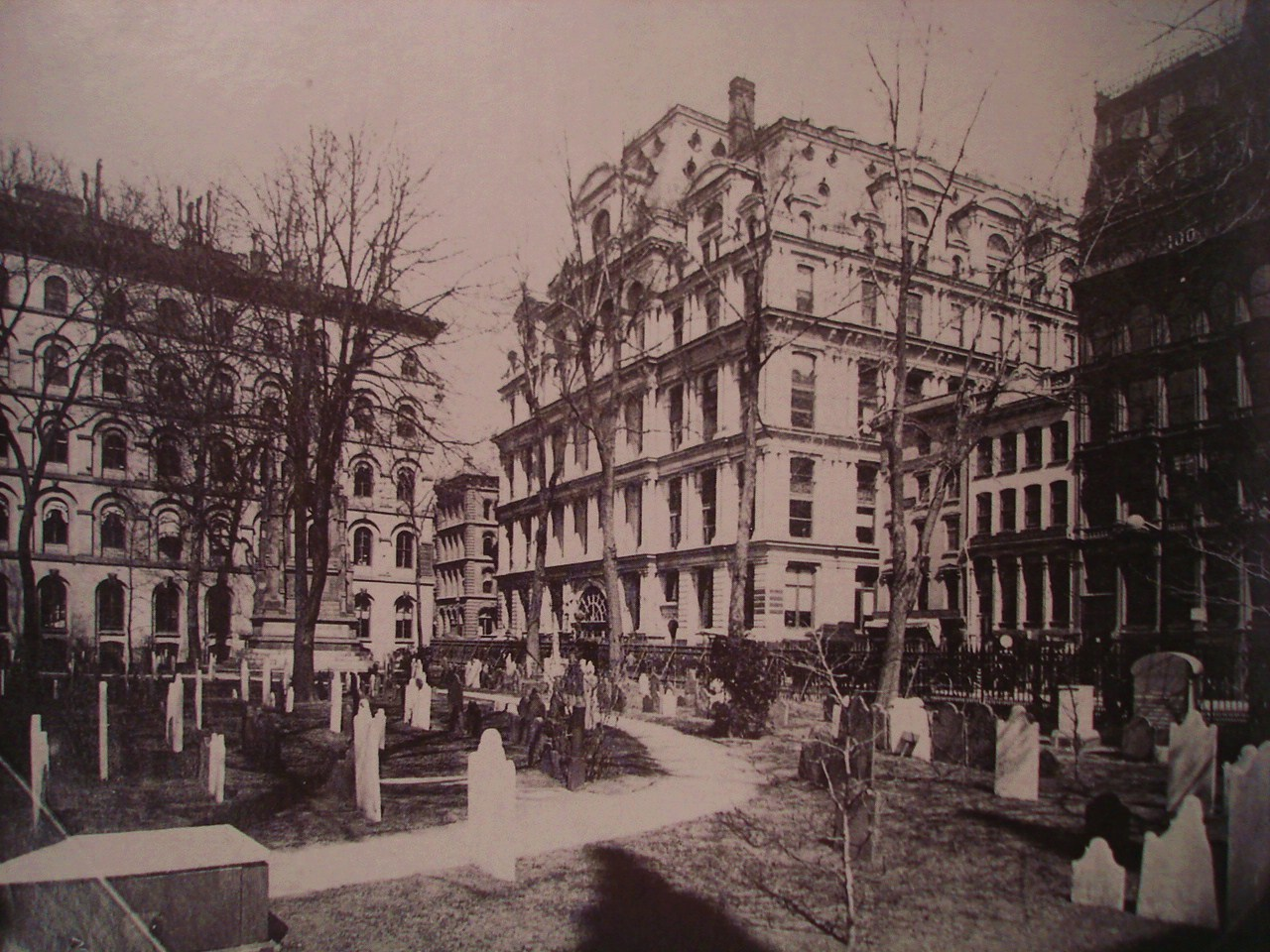
1870 view from Trinity Church's cemetery

The company's success led Equitable's board to hold a meeting in December 1865, because the firm needed extra space and had already been subjected to two fires. Over the next two years, the company acquired seven lots at 116–124 Broadway and 84–86 Cedar Street; the lots totaled 8,000 square feet (740 m^{2}) and had cost an average $59.62 per square foot ($641.7/m^{2}). When Hyde suggested to Equitable's building committee he wanted to build an eight-story edifice, the committee viewed the proposal skeptically; Hyde stated the building would include elevators. The committee looked at buildings in other cities across the U.S. and hosted a building competition with several contestants. (Note: In total, between five and eleven architects and firms competed, although the precise number is unclear.) Charles D. Gambrill and Henry Hobson Richardson, Richard Morris Hunt, and George B. Post each submitted proposals, which were rejected by the committee. Gambrill and Richardson's plan, which featured a large central clerking hall lit by skylights, prioritized the usage of the site. By contrast, Hunt proposed three schemes in which a geometric clerking hall was illuminated by exterior walls. While Post's plans no longer exist, his designs influenced the inclusion of the sculptural pediment and the facade pavilion.

In January 1868, Equitable's building committee announced that Gilman and Kendall had won the competition. Their partnership had been strained at the time of the commission; an October 1869 New York Herald article called the Equitable Life Building Kendall's "first great work", implying that Gilman was no longer involved in the project. Furthermore, even though Post had not won the design competition for the building, he was still credited as one of the building's architects. Post had redesigned the structural system for the office floors and had recommended the use of brick and terracotta above a granite base. Architectural critic Montgomery Schuyler wrote the elevators were included after Post and Hyde had insisted on them. To demonstrate his confidence in the elevator, Post offered to take an office on the seventh story, the top rental floor, at a price "based on and equaling the highest rent paid on Broadway" for similar office space. Hyde doubled the offer, which Post accepted.

The seven buildings on the site were demolished in mid-1868, and construction on the lots at Broadway and Cedar Street began the same year. The first portion of the structure opened on May 1, 1870. The building had cost nearly $4.16 million (equal to $97 million in 2024). Despite Equitable's growing assets—which had increased from $5 million in 1868 to $11 million in 1870—competitors and the public accused the company and Hyde of "extravagance". The Equitable Life Building was more lavish than other office buildings because of its construction materials and the use of elevators. The building was profitable, earning $136,000 a year in rent by 1871, with 400 people working inside the building. Its features led other landlords to add elevators and additional floors to their buildings. The design inspired the addition of mansard roofs to other insurance buildings nearby, including those of Mutual Life, New York Life, Metropolitan Life, and Germania Life.

=== Expansions ===
Equitable's operations increased further, so that by 1872 workers were cramped for space, leading the company to purchase property to the rear and create a law library. The lots at 122–124 Broadway were leased to a Delmonico's restaurant. The New York Times wrote in 1875 that the building's site and facilities allowed it to "embrace perhaps greater advantages than any other commercial building in the City". A large expansion began in March 1875 was completed two months later. Electric lighting was added on a trial basis in 1878, making the Equitable Life Building the city's first office building with such lighting. The Equitable Life Building was extremely profitable: in 1892, Equitable's annual income from renting was estimated to be $300,000, which real-estate developers estimated was four percent of the true value of the building.

In 1885, Equitable filed plans with the New York City Department of Buildings to build a large extension to the Equitable Life Building. Several lots on Broadway and Pine Street, measuring 80 by 191 feet (24 by 58 m), would be acquired for the annex. The mansard roof would be removed and replaced with the eighth and ninth stories. David H. King Jr. was hired as the annex's general contractor. The expansion was completed by 1887; George B. Post designed the expansion, while David H. King Jr. was the builder. It was during the late-1880s expansion that the block-through lobby was added, and the Cafe Savarin was opened. At the time, the Equitable Life Building occupied the entire block except for the corner lots on Nassau Street. The author R. Carlyle Buley stated that Equitable did not assume control of the entire block until 1906, when it bought the lots at 17 and 23–25 Nassau Street. These buildings were respectively the Belmont Building and the Western National Building, which were never subsumed by the Equitable Life Building. Post was asked to prepare plans for a 40-story structure in 1897, though the design was ultimately not executed.

The securities vault and the statue of Hyde were added at the end of the 19th century. By 1900, the Equitable Life Building had over 3,000 occupants. In 1907, Daniel H. Burnham's company D. H. Burnham & Company had proposed replacing the Equitable Life Building with a 33-story structure (later changed to a 62-story building), but the plan was ultimately dropped. Rather, Equitable constructed the Hazen Building on nearby Greenwich Street to store its files.

=== Destruction ===
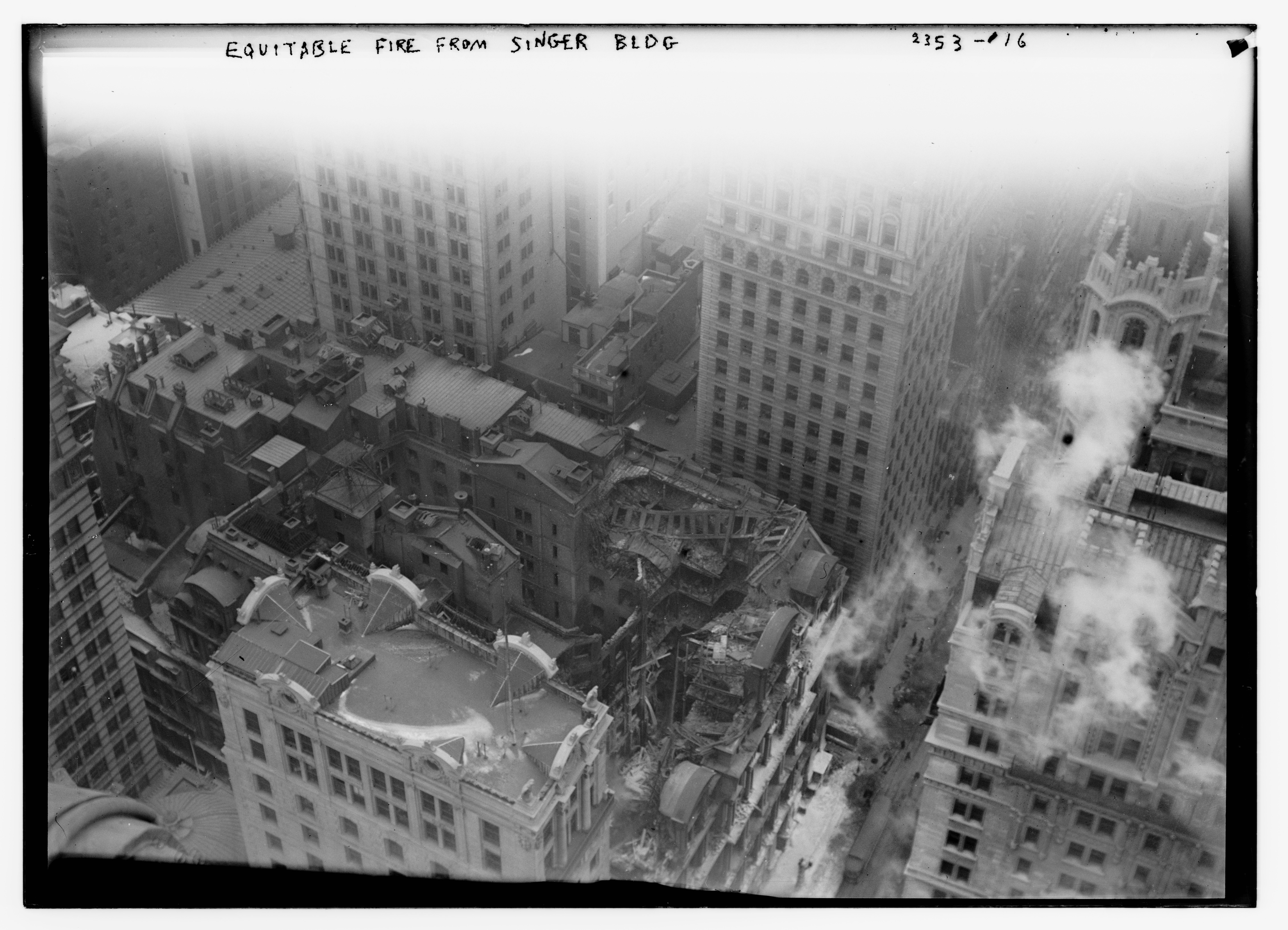
1912 fire

The Equitable Life Building, described as fireproof, was destroyed by a massive fire on January 9, 1912. The fire started in the basement at about 5:00 a.m. EST but quickly spread to the rest of the building, exacerbated by the open stairways and elevator shafts. Fire crews from Manhattan and Brooklyn were called to put out the blaze, holding up traffic on the Brooklyn Bridge and nearby streets. The outside temperature at the time was 18 °F (−8 °C), causing the water from the fire trucks to freeze on the building. The tower's height was a disadvantage: the fire trucks' ladders could not reach the upper stories, and lifelines from nearby buildings snapped before they could be secured onto the building. There were several high-profile rescues, including that of William Giblin, president of major tenant Mercantile Safe Deposit Company, who had been trapped in a vault. The fire was brought under control at about 9:30 p.m. EST. Smoke continued to billow from the site two days later, and two of the outer structural walls remained standing after the blaze.

Six people died, including five employees and one firefighter. Three of the victims had been trapped on the roof while trying to escape. The money in the vaults, appraised at $385 million, was unscathed. Though the building was not covered by insurance policies, Equitable suffered a relatively small loss, since the building was valued at less than $3 million, the amount the company had saved by self-insuring its properties. Damage was estimated at $2 million, but the structure was considered "no asset"—it was worthless because of the high demand for vacant land in the Financial District. Most of the losses were in the value of the building's law library. The land was actually worth more after the fire than beforehand.

Equitable quickly set up temporary quarters at the City Investing Building. The society also sold the land to T. Coleman du Pont in October 1912 for $13.5 million. Du Pont developed the present Equitable Building, designed by Ernest R. Graham & Associates, on the same plot between 1913 and 1915. The massive bulk of the newer building was a major impetus behind the city's 1916 Zoning Resolution, which placed limits on building height and shape.

== Legacy ==
The initial structure has been described as one of three influential early skyscrapers of Lower Manhattan, along with the Western Union Telegraph Building and the New York Tribune Building. Architectural historians Sarah Bradford Landau and Carl W. Condit wrote that the Equitable Life Building was considered to be one of the first skyscrapers. However, the classification of the Equitable Life Building as a skyscraper is disputed. The Tribune and Western Union Buildings are variously cited as being either the first-ever skyscrapers, or the next major skyscrapers after the Equitable Life Building because of their substantial height increase. While Robert A. M. Stern did not consider the building to be a skyscraper, he wrote that the structure was "the city's, and therefore the world's, first modern office building".
