= Equitable Holdings =

American financial services company

Equitable Holdings, Inc.

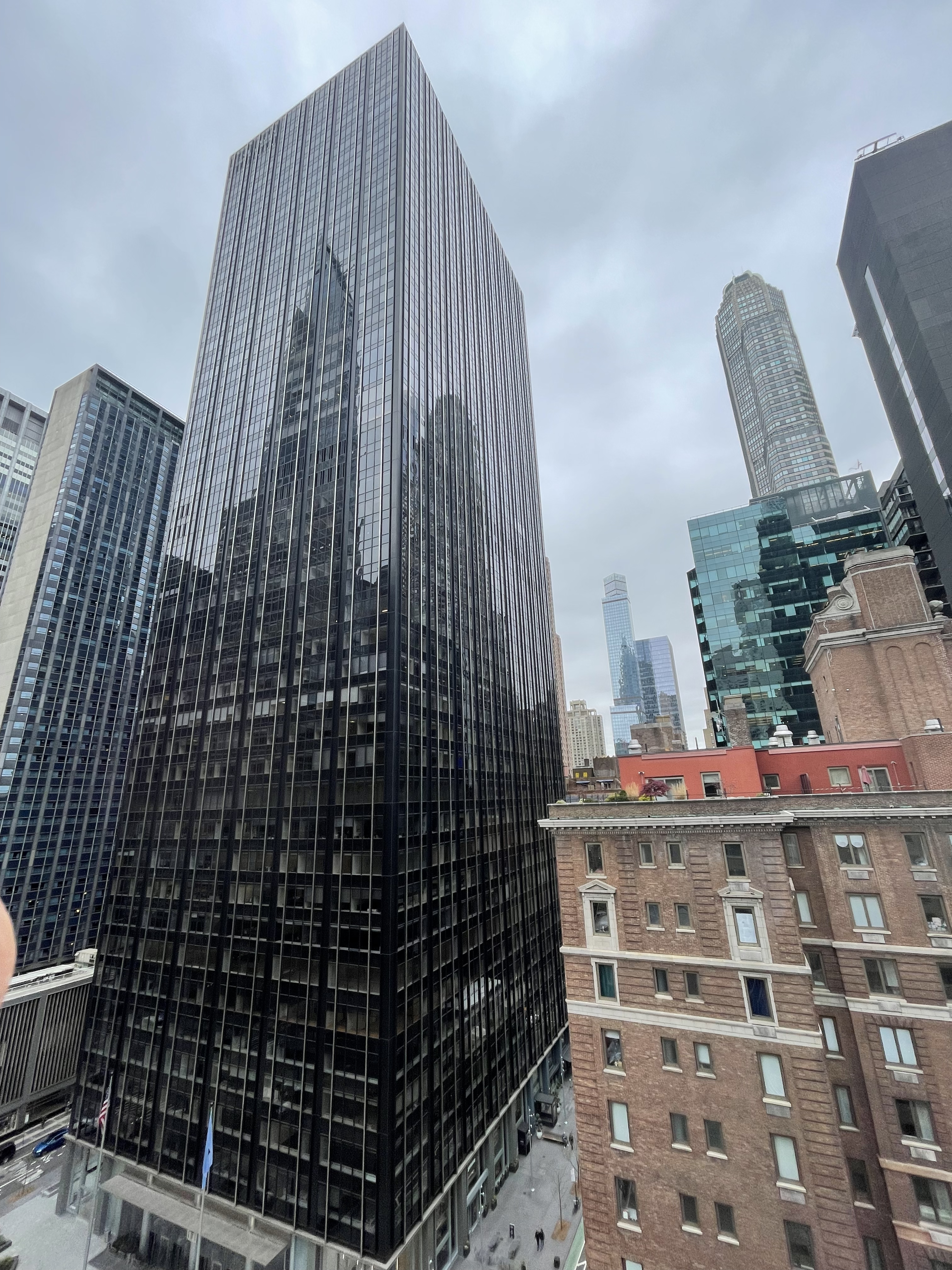
- Headquarters at 1345 Avenue of the Americas
- Type: Public
- Traded as: NYSE: EQH; S&P 400 component
- Industry: Financial services
- Founded: 1859; 167 years ago
- Founder: Henry Baldwin Hyde
- Headquarters: 1345 Avenue of the Americas, New York City, United States
- Key people: Mark Pearson (president & CEO)
- Products: Insurance (life, annuities, reinsurance)
- Revenue: ▲US$12.4 billion (2024)
- Net income: ▲US$1.23 billion (2024)
- AUM: ▲US$792 billion (2024)
- Total assets: ▲US$296 billion (2024)
- Total equity: ▼US$1.59 billion (2024)
- Number of employees: c. 8,000 (2024)
- Subsidiaries: AllianceBernstein; Equitable Life
- Website: equitableholdings.com

Equitable Holdings, Inc. (formerly The Equitable Life Assurance Society of the United States and AXA Equitable Life Insurance Company, and also known as The Equitable) is an American financial services and insurance company that was founded in 1859 by Henry Baldwin Hyde.

In 1991, French insurance firm AXA acquired majority control of Equitable. In 2004, the company officially changed its name to AXA Equitable Life Insurance Company. In January 2020, it changed its name to Equitable Holdings, Inc. following its spinoff from AXA and the related public offerings beginning in May 2018.

== History ==
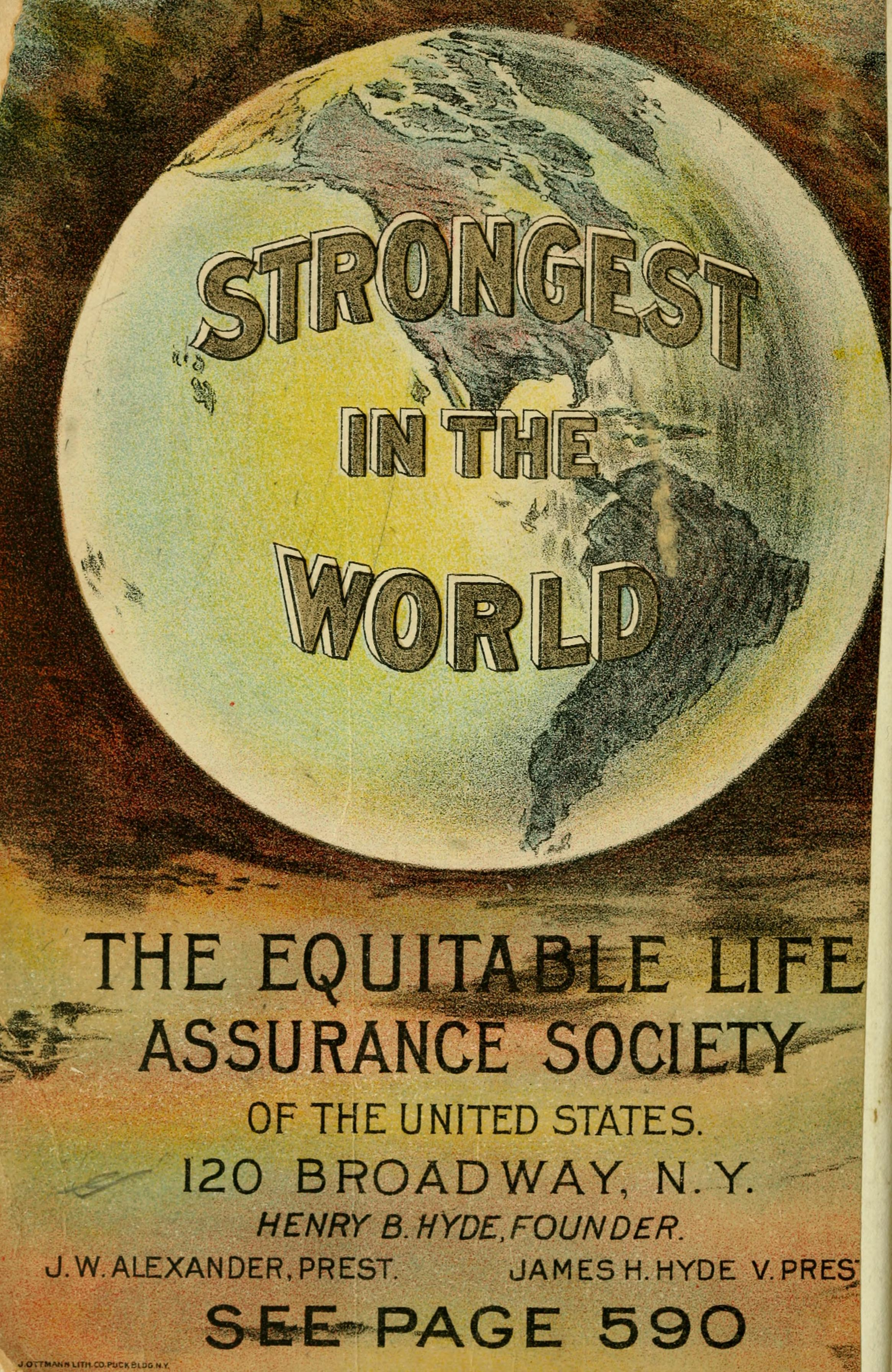
Advertisement in The World Almanac and Encyclopedia, 1904

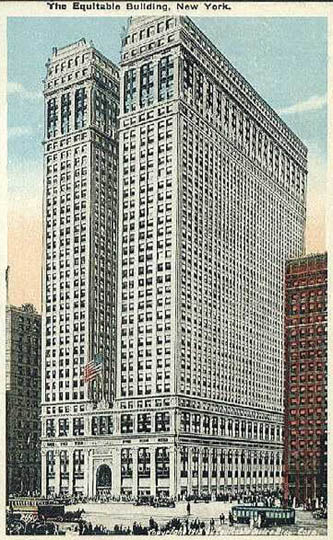
Equitable Building at 120 Broadway on a postcard, c. 1918

The Equitable Life Assurance Society of the United States opened its headquarters at the Equitable Life Building in 1870 in the Financial District of Manhattan, with entrances facing Broadway, Pine Street, and Cedar Street. Aside from Henry Baldwin Hyde, who was president of Equitable, the firm's officers included James Waddell Alexander (vice president); George W. Phillips (actuary), who was Vice President of the Actuarial Society of America; and Samuel Borrowe (secretary), a member of a prominent New York family connected to the Hallett and Alsop families.

Between 1889 and 1891, Equitable built the Palais Equitable at Stock-im-Eisen-Platz, today part of the Stephansplatz, in the Innere Stadt of Vienna, Austria.

James Waddell Alexander was the company president at the time of the Hyde costume ball scandal in 1905. James Hazen Hyde, the son of the founder and a vice president of the company, was falsely accused through a media smear campaign initiated by Alexander and board directors E. H. Harriman, Henry Clay Frick and J.P. Morgan of charging a fabulous $200,000 Versailles-themed affair to the company. The repercussions rocked Wall Street and resulted in an investigation of the entire insurance industry by the New York State Legislature.

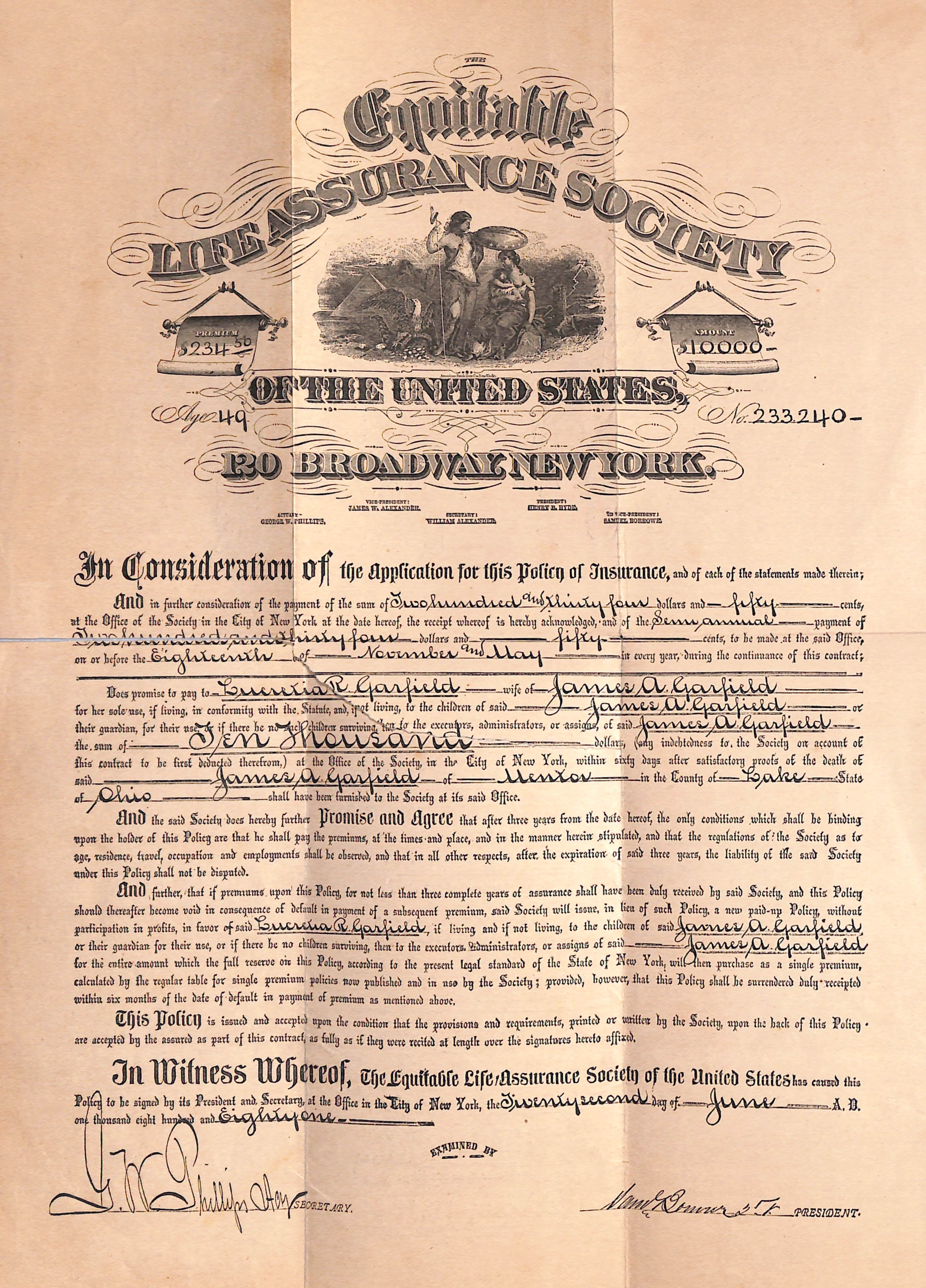
A life insurance policy for President James A. Garfield written by the Equitable Life Assurance Society of the United States on the 22nd of June, 1881, signed 9 days prior to Garfield being shot by Charles J. Guiteau at the Baltimore and Potomac Railroad Station in Washington, D.C.

After the company's headquarters building burned down in 1912, Equitable erected the Equitable Building on the same site in Manhattan.

As one of the largest insurers of its time, Equitable had close ties to influential industrial magnates. In 1915, T. Coleman du Pont acquired a majority stake in Equitable Life Assurance from J. P. Morgan Jr.

In 1943, during World War II, Equitable began underwriting policies for the War Agencies Employees Protective Association to provide group life insurance to U.S. Government employees working in or around war zones. Through WAEPA, Equitable sold policies to employees of some 40 U.S. agencies, including individuals from the Office of Strategic Services and War Information, which often sent their men behind enemy lines, and air-traveling statesmen and Congressmen. By May 1945, only 24 death claims had been filed (about half the normal peacetime rate for a group plan covering 7,000 workers), allowing the insurer to return roughly 30% of the premiums to WAEPA.

In 1954, following blockbusting in East Palo Alto, Equitable pursued a policy forbidding issuing mortgages to white families in integrated communities in order to make receiving government-insured mortgages more difficult in racially heterogeneous areas. This decision helped facilitate white flight and the resulting demographic shift of East Palo Alto.

In 1985, the Equitable Life Assurance Society of the United States, then the third largest life insurance company in the country, formed Equitable Real Estate Investment Management, a subsidiary used by Equitable Life to develop and finance new real estate projects and manage the US$20 billion worth of real estate under Equitable's control.

In December 1990, Equitable announced its decision to demutualize under New York's liberalizing laws. This was intended to enable Equitable to increase and diversify its asset base.

=== AXA acquisition ===
On July 18, 1991, AXA Group of France bought a $1 billion stake in Equitable Life Assurance Society, for a 49% stake in the business. This enabled Equitable to set aside $500 million for losses in its real estate and junk bond portfolios. There had been rumors that Equitable was nearing a bankruptcy filing prior to the AXA Group infusion of capital.

The investment by AXA Group significantly altered the trajectory of both companies. By 1997, the assets of the U.S. operation, the Equitable Insurance Group, had reached nearly a quarter of a trillion dollars, and by 2003, AXA Equitable Insurance Company was the leading carrier in the world with more than 50 million clients, in more than 50 countries, and with nearly a trillion dollars in client assets.

By 2018, AXA, facing tougher European solvency laws, decided to re-balance its operations from life and annuities and towards property and casualty – from financial risks to insurance risks. As a result, the company decided to begin the process to spin off the U.S. operations, the old Equitable Life Assurance company. In its filing, AXA noted that once the IPO took place, there would be four separate companies created: AXA Equitable Life Insurance Company, AXA Distribution Holding Corp., EQ AZ Life Re Company, and MONY Life Insurance Company of America.

=== Equitable Holdings ===
In May 2018, AXA announced the successful completion of the IPO of AXA Equitable Holdings, raising $2.75 billion on the sale of 24.5% of the outstanding shares. Additionally, the company announced an issuance of $750 million of bonds mandatorily exchangeable into shares of AXA Equitable Holdings stock. And finally, $502 million of options were exercised, bringing the total to $4.02 billion in proceeds to AXA.

On March 25, 2019, AXA announced the successful completion of a secondary common stock offering of 40 million shares of AXA Equitable Holdings, Inc. (ticker EQH), bringing down their ownership stake from approximately 60% to 48.3% and raising net proceeds of $1.5 billion.

On November 7, 2019, AXA announced the sale of its remaining stake in AXA Equitable Holdings (EQH), selling 144 million shares of common stock to Goldman Sachs, which was the sole underwriter for the public offering of the shares. The expected close date was stated by the company at the time as November 13, 2019. This brought to a close a long and largely successful chapter in Equitable's history – the end of the AXA Group ownership of the company.

On January 14, 2020, Equitable unveiled its new branding. In addition to an operating name change, the refreshed brand included a new logo, representative of the Greek goddess Athena, which has been a consistent element of the company’s 160-year-old visual identity.

In March 2026, Equitable Holdings announced a merger with Corebridge Financial through a all-stock merger worth $22 billion, which would create a combined company with $1.5 trillion in assets under management and over 12 million clients.
