= Pnina =

- Language: Hebrew

Origin
- Meaning: "pearl"

Other names
- Variant forms: Peninnah, Penina, Peninah
- Related names: Margalit, Perl

Pnina (Hebrew: פְּנִינָּה or פְּנִנָּה) is a Jewish feminine given name, meaning "pearl" in Hebrew. Alternative spellings include Peninnah, Penina, and Peninah.

Names of similar origin include Margalit, Pearl, as well as names Perl/Perla/Perle/Perel: פרל, פרעל.

Besides the biblical figure Peninnah, notable people with the name include:

- Penina Axelrad, American aerospace engineer
- Penina Davidson (born 1995), New Zealand basketball player
- Pnina Gary (1927–2023), Israeli actress and director
- Pnina Granirer (born 1935), Romanian-Canadian artist
- Pnina Herzog (1925/6–2005), Israeli pharmacist
- Pnina Moed Kass (born 1938), Belgian-Israeli artist
- Penina Moïse (1797–1880), American poet
- Pnina Rosenblum (born 1954), Israeli businesswoman and politician
- Pnina Salzman (1922–2006), Israeli pianist
- Pnina Tamano-Shata (born 1981), Israeli politician
- Pnina Tornai (born 1962), Israeli fashion designer
- Pnina Werbner (1944–2023), British anthropologist

== See also ==
- Margalit, Margolies, Margolin, Margoliouth, Margolis, Margolus, Margolyes, Margules, Margulies, Margulis, Pearl, Perl, Pnina
