= Perl (surname) =

- Alfredo Perl (born 1965), Chilean-German pianist and conductor
- Arnold Perl, American dramatist
- Curdin Perl, Swiss cross-country skier
- Edward Perl (1926–2014), American neuroscientist
- Gisella Perl (1907–1988), Jewish Holocaust survivor and author
- Günter Perl, German football referee
- Gyula Pál, born Gyula Perl, Hungarian-Danish mathematician
- Hille Perl (born 1965), German musician (viola da gamba, lirone)
- Wubong (1950–2013), born Jacob Perl, Polish Zen master
- Jed Perl (born 1951), American art critic and writer
- Josef Perl (1930–2018), Holocaust survivor and educator
- Joseph Perl, German-Jewish writer and religious commentator
- Karl Perl, Austrian sculptor and engraver
- Martin Lewis Perl (1927–2014), American physicist and Nobel Prize laureate
- Rafał Perl (born 1981), Polish diplomat
- Reto Perl, Swiss ice hockey player
- Sasha Perl-Raver, American writer and actress
- Sondra Perl, American academic
- Teri Perl, American mathematics educator
- William Perl, American physicist and Soviet spy
- Zoltán Perl, Hungarian basketball player

== See also ==
- Margalit, Margolies, Margolin, Margoliouth, Margolis, Margolus, Margolyes, Margules, Margulies, Margulis, Pearl, Perl, Pnina
- Pearl
- Perl (given name)
