= Pearl (surname) =

Pearl is a surname. Notable people with the surname include:

- Barry Pearl (born 1950), American actor
- Bill Pearl (1930–2022), American professional bodybuilder and athlete
- Bruce Pearl (born 1960), American college basketball coach
- Daniel Pearl (1963–2002), American journalist who was kidnapped and murdered in Pakistan
- Judea Pearl (born 1936), computer scientist and philosopher
- Julian Pearl (born 1999), American football player
- Leslie Pearl (born 1952), U.S. songwriter
- Matthew Pearl (born 1975), American novelist
- Minnie Pearl (1912–1996), American country comedian
- Nancy Pearl (born 1945), American librarian
- Perry Diamond Pearl (born c. 1824), American politician
- Raymond Pearl (1879–1940), American biologist
- Shosha Pearl, pen name of an anonymous Orthodox Jewish writer
- Steven Pearl (born 1987), American basketball coach and son of Bruce˜
- Tara Eden Pearl, American businesswoman

== See also ==
- Margalit, Margolies, Margolin, Margoliouth, Margolis, Margolus, Margolyes, Margules, Margulies, Margulis, Pearl, Perl, Pnina
- Perle (disambiguation)
