= Margolis =

Margolis is a surname that, like its variants shown below, is derived from the Ashkenazi Hebrew pronunciation of the Hebrew word מַרְגָּלִית (Israeli Hebrew: [maʁɡaˈlit]), meaning 'pearl'. Notable people with the surname include:

- Alisa Margolis (born 1975), Ukrainian artist based in Berlin
- Barbara Margolis (1929–2009), prisoners' rights advocate and official greeter of New York City
- Char Margolis, American spiritualist
- Cindy Margolis (born 1965), American model
- David Margolis (industrialist) (1930–2008), American industrialist
- Ephraim Zalman Margolis (1762–1828), Galician rabbi born in Brody
- Eric Margolis (journalist) (born 1942/43), American-born journalist
- Eric Margolis (sociologist) (born 1947), American sociologist at the Arizona State University
- Esther Margolis, president of Newmarket Publishing and Communications and Newmarket Press
- Gavriel Zev Margolis (1847–1935), Orthodox rabbi in the United States
- Gwen Margolis (1934–2020), American politician
- Helen Margolis, British physicist
- Henry M. Margolis (1909–1989), New York industrialist, theatrical producer, and philanthropist
- Herbert I. Margolis (1900–1984), Russian-American Orthodontist, inventor, professor
- Howard Margolis (1932–2009), American social scientist
- Isaac Margolis (1842–1887), Russian-Polish rabbi and author
- Jack S. Margolis, author of several books about recreational drugs
- James Margolis (born 1936), American Olympic fencer
- Jane Margolis, American social scientist
- Jeff Margolis (1946–2025), American television director and producer
- Joseph Margolis (1924–2021), American philosopher
- Judith Margolis (born 1944), Israel-based American artist
- Kitty Margolis (born 1955), American jazz singer
- Laurie Margolis (born 1950), BBC journalist
- Lawrence S. Margolis (1935–2017), American judge
- Leo Margolis (1927–1997), Canadian parasitologist
- Mark Margolis (1939–2023), American actor
- Max Margolis (1866–1932), Lithuanian-born American philologist
- Maxine Margolis, American anthropologist
- Rachel Margolis (1921–2015), Ph.D., author of A Partisan from Vilna
- Seth Margolis, American novelist
- Zoe Margolis (born 1972), blogger of Girl with a One-Track Mind
- Al Margolis, noise music artist known by the pseudonym If, Bwana
- Barbara Margolis, maiden name of Barbara Roche (born 1954), UK Labour politician
- Reid Margolis or DJ Reid Speed, drum and bass and 2-step DJ from New York City

== See also ==
- Margalit, Margolies, Margolin, Margoliouth, Margolis, Margolus, Margolyes, Margules, Margulies, Margulis, Pearl, Perl, Pnina
