= Margalit =

Margalit (Hebrew: מרגלית, lit. pearl) is a Hebrew-language given name and surname. Before the First Aliyah it was mainly used in this form by Sephardic Jews, while its variant Margulis was more common among Ashkenazis. It is cognate with English Margaret via Greek μαργαρίτης, also meaning pearl. It may refer to:

== Surname ==
- Avishai Margalit (born 1939), Israeli philosopher
- Dan Margalit (journalist) (1938–2025), Israeli journalist, author and television host
- Dan Margalit (mathematician) (born 1976), American mathematician
- Erel Margalit (born 1961), Israeli politician and a high-tech and social entrepreneur
- Gilad Margalit (1959–2014), Israeli historian and writer, professor at the University of Haifa
- Israela Margalit (born 1944), American pianist and writer
- Itay Margalit (born 1970), Israeli high jumper
- Meir Margalit (born 1952), Argentine-born Israeli researcher of the history of the Jewish community in Mandatory Palestine and a founder of the Israeli Committee Against House Demolitions
- Meir Margalit (actor) (1906–1974), Israeli stage actor
- Yanki Margalit (born 1962), Israeli entrepreneur and speaker best known for starting Aladdin Knowledge Systems

== First name ==
- Margalit Fox (born 1961), American author and writer for The New York Times
- Maggie Gyllenhaal (born 1977, as Margalit Ruth Gyllenhaal), American actress, half Ashkenazi Jewish descent
- Margalit Tzan'ani (born 1948), also known as Margol, Israeli singer and television personality
- Margalit Sharon (died 1962), first wife of Ariel Sharon
- Margalit Matitiahu (born 1935), Israeli poet in Ladino and Hebrew

== See also ==
- Margalit, Margolies, Margolin, Margoliouth, Margolis, Margolus, Margolyes, Margules, Margulies, Margulis, Pearl, Perl, Pnina
- Pearl (given name)
- Pearlman
- Perl (disambiguation)
- Pnina (disambiguation)
