= Margalis =

Margalis is a surname. Notable people with the surname include:

- Melanie Margalis (born 1991), American swimmer
- Robert Margalis (born 1982), American swimmer

== See also ==
- Margalit
