= Merkinė Eldership =

Merkinė Eldership Merkinės seniūnija
- Eldership
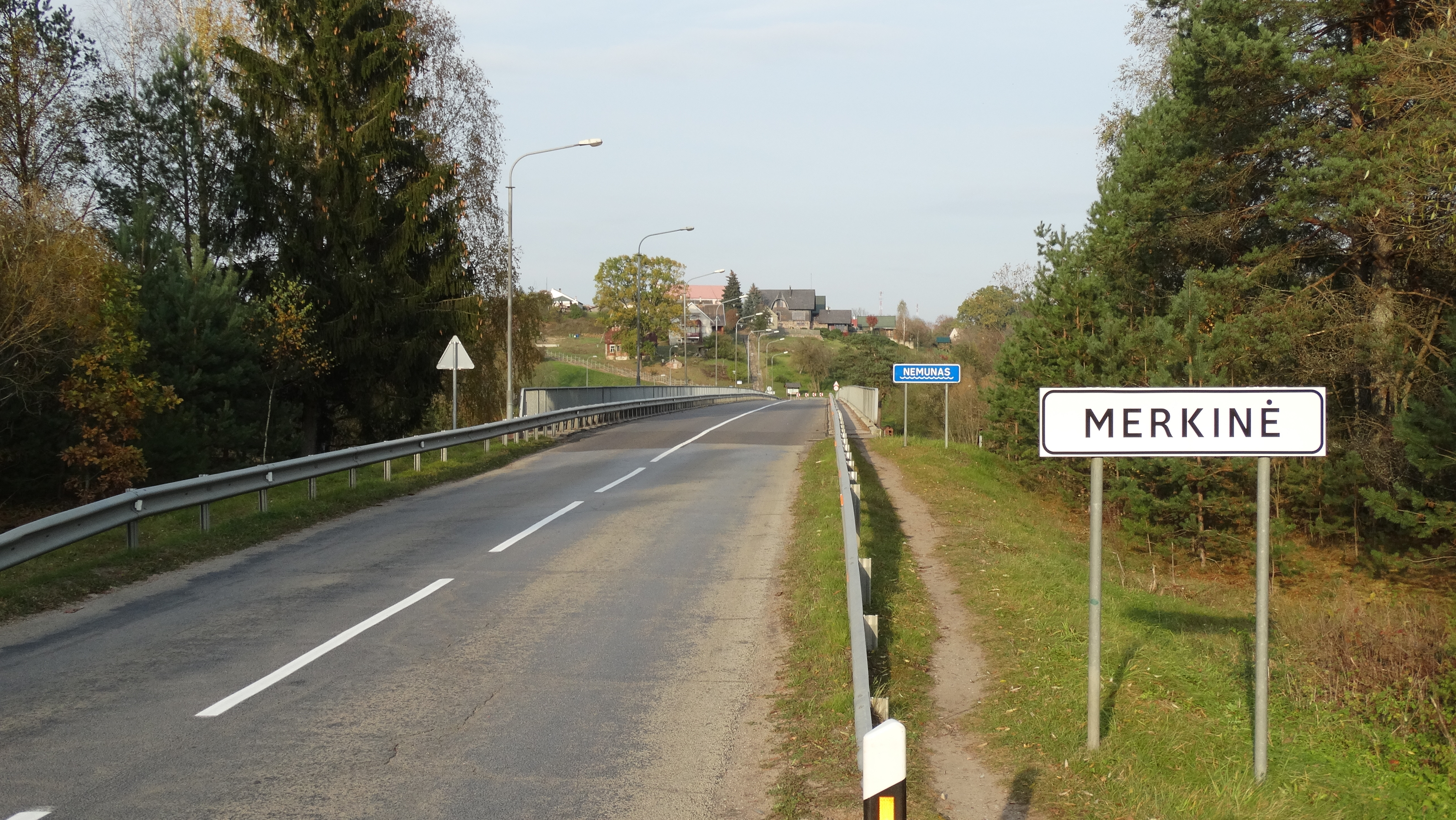
- Street in Merkinė

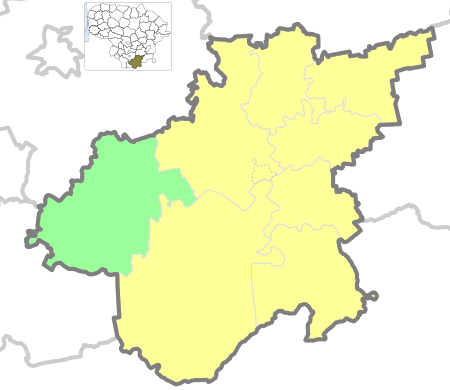
- Location of Merkinė Eldership
- Coordinates: 54.168°N 24.192°E
- Country: Lithuania
- Ethnographic region: Dzūkija
- County: Alytus County
- Municipality: Varėna District Municipality
- Administrative centre: Merkinė

Area
  - Total: 390 km^{2} (150 sq mi)

Population (2021)
  - Total: 2,552
  - Density: 6.5/km^{2} (17/sq mi)
- Time zone: UTC+2 (EET)
  - Summer (DST): UTC+3 (EEST)

Merkinė Eldership (Lithuanian: Merkinės seniūnija) is a Lithuanian eldership, located in the western part of Varėna District Municipality.
