= Shosha =

Shosha may refer to:

- Mount Shosha near Himeji, Japan, location of the Engyō-ji temple
- Shosha (cheese), a kind of Tibetan cheese
- Shosha (novel), a novel by Isaac Bashevis Singer
- Shosha (river) (Russian: Шоша), a river in Tver Oblast and Moscow Oblast in Russia

== People ==
- Luthando Shosha, South African television presenter and radio personality
- Shosha Goren, Israeli actress, playwright and comedian
- Shosha Pearl, pen name of an anonymous Orthodox Jewish writer
