= Perl (given name) =

Perl (פּערל) is a Yiddish feminine given name. Diminutive: Perele/Pereleh. The corresponding Hebrew names are Pnina and Margalit. The name gave rise to the Jewish matronymic surname Perlin.

Notable people with the name include:

- Perl D. Decker (1875–1934), a United States House Representative from Missouri
- Perl Karpovskaya (1897–1970), birth name of Polina Zhemchuzhina, Soviet politician, best known as the wife of the Soviet foreign minister Vyacheslav Molotov

== See also ==
- Perel
