= The Lot Radio =

American online radio station in New York City

- Brooklyn, New York; United States

Programming
- Format: Free-form radio

Ownership
- Owner: Francois Vaxelaire
- Operator: Francois Vaxelaire and Pauline Le Mell

Links
- Website: www.thelotradio.com

The Lot Radio is an online radio station founded by Francois Vaxelaire in Brooklyn, New York. It is operated by Vaxelaire and Pauline Le Mell. The station is based in a shipping container in Williamsburg. Notable guests include Alan Braxe, DJ Falcon, Four Tet, Busy P, Floating Points, Hot Chip, Ellen Allien, Louie Vega, Ben UFO, Octo Octa, Moxie, Nina Kraviz, Falty DL, Kim Ann Foxman, Perel, members of the collective Discwoman, Fred Again, Chet Faker and many others. Each broadcast features live DJ sets with an emphasis on electronic music, disco, and soul music. Broadcasts are archived on lot radio's Mixcloud.

== Team ==
In addition to founder and owner Francois Vaxelaire, the station is run by Pauline Le Mell, who acts as "station manager, director of programming, coordinator of daily operations, social media manager, event producer, and catch-all liaison for everyone from labels to artists.", and program directors Chris Cherry and Lloyd Harris.

== Awards ==
The Lot Radio was Winner of Best Online Radio Station, North America in 2016.
