= Margaliot (disambiguation) =

Margaliot is a moshav in northern Israel.

Margaliot may also refer to:

- Abraham Margaliot (1920-1987) Israeli historian
- Asher Zelig Margaliot (1893–1969), Kabbalist
- Haim Margaliot-Kalvarisky (1868-1947), agronomist, principal director of the Jewish Colonization Association, supervisor of Jewish colonies in Galilee in the early twentieth century
- Moses ben Samuel Levi Margaliot (1778–1817), Chief Rabbi of Transilvania
- Ran Margaliot (born 1988) Israeli racing cyclist

== See also ==
- Margulis, lists other similar surnames
