= Merkinė =

- Town
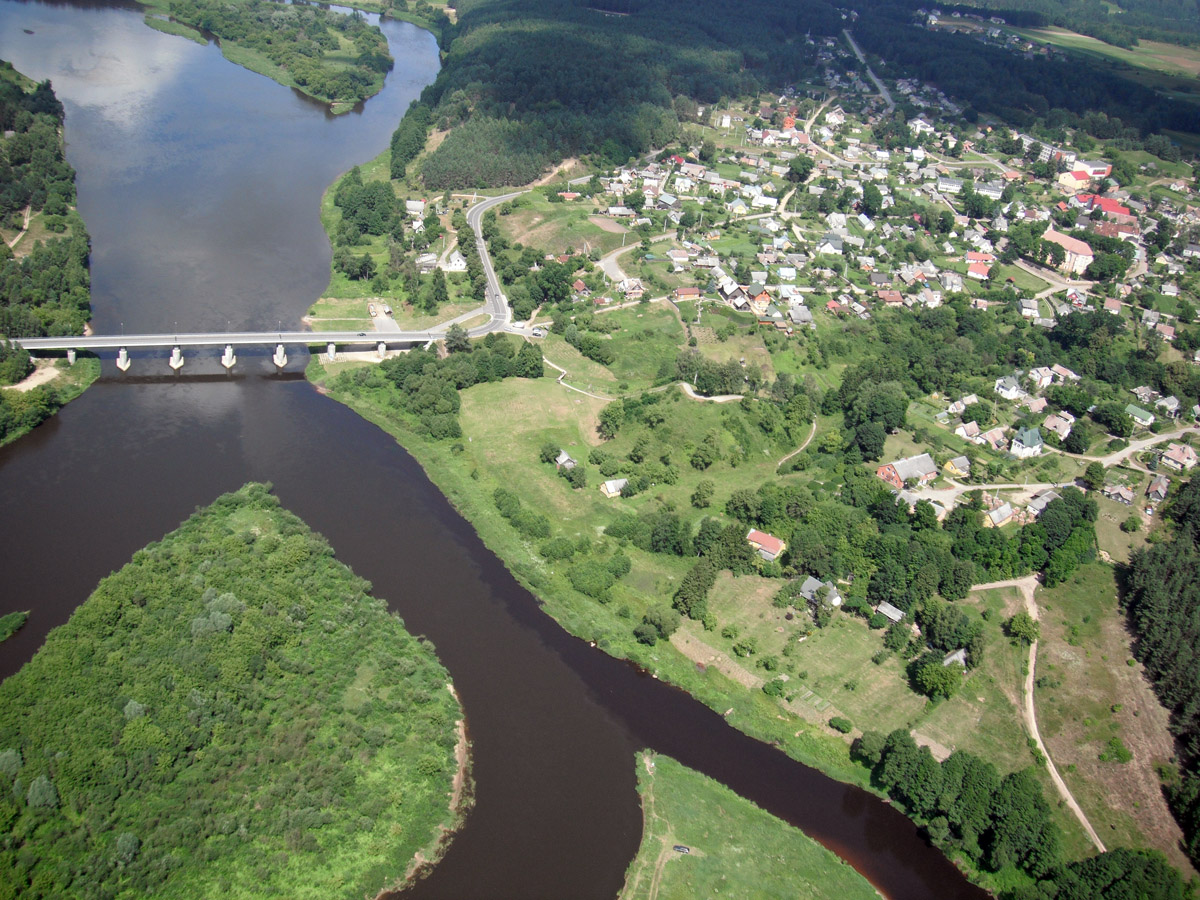
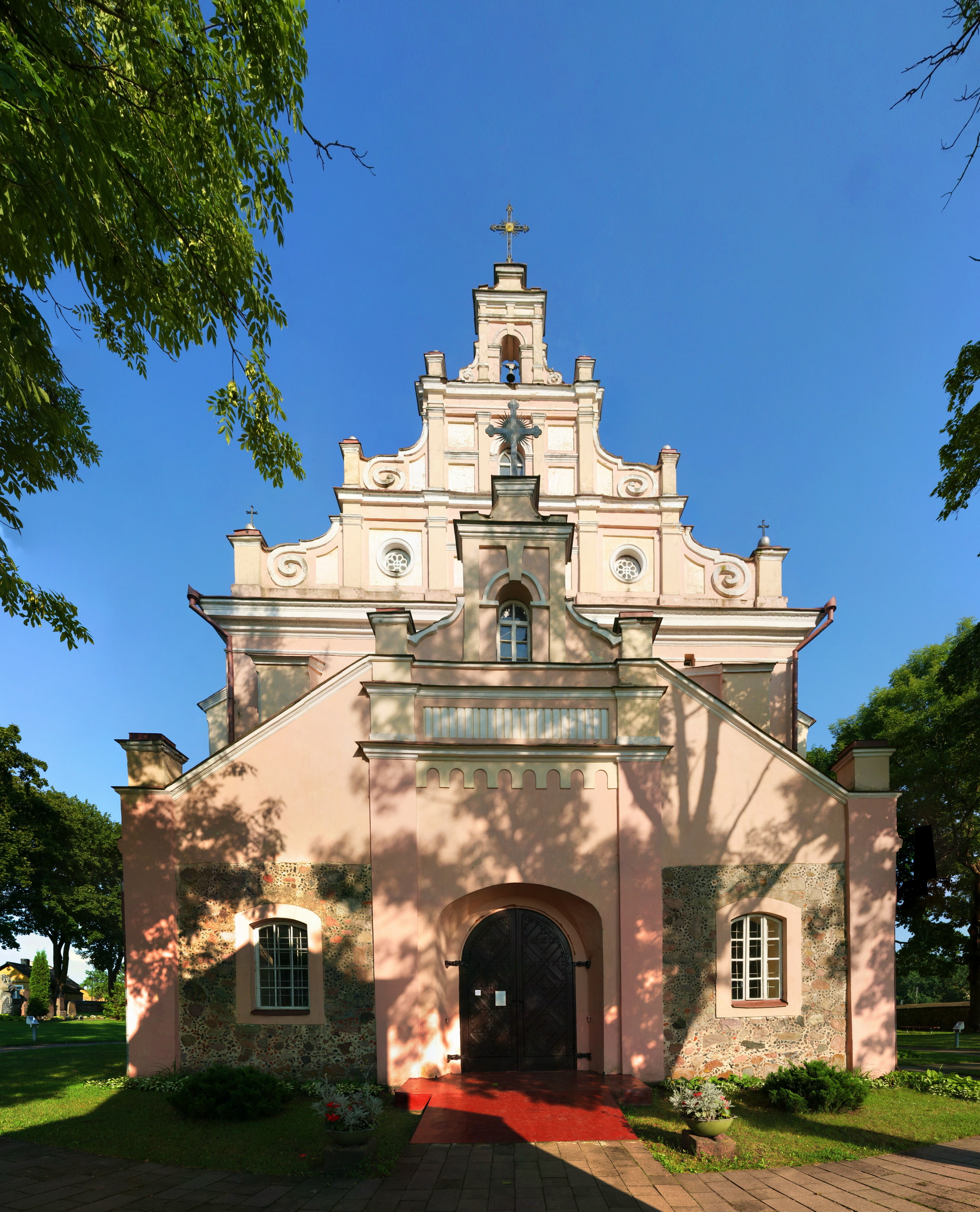
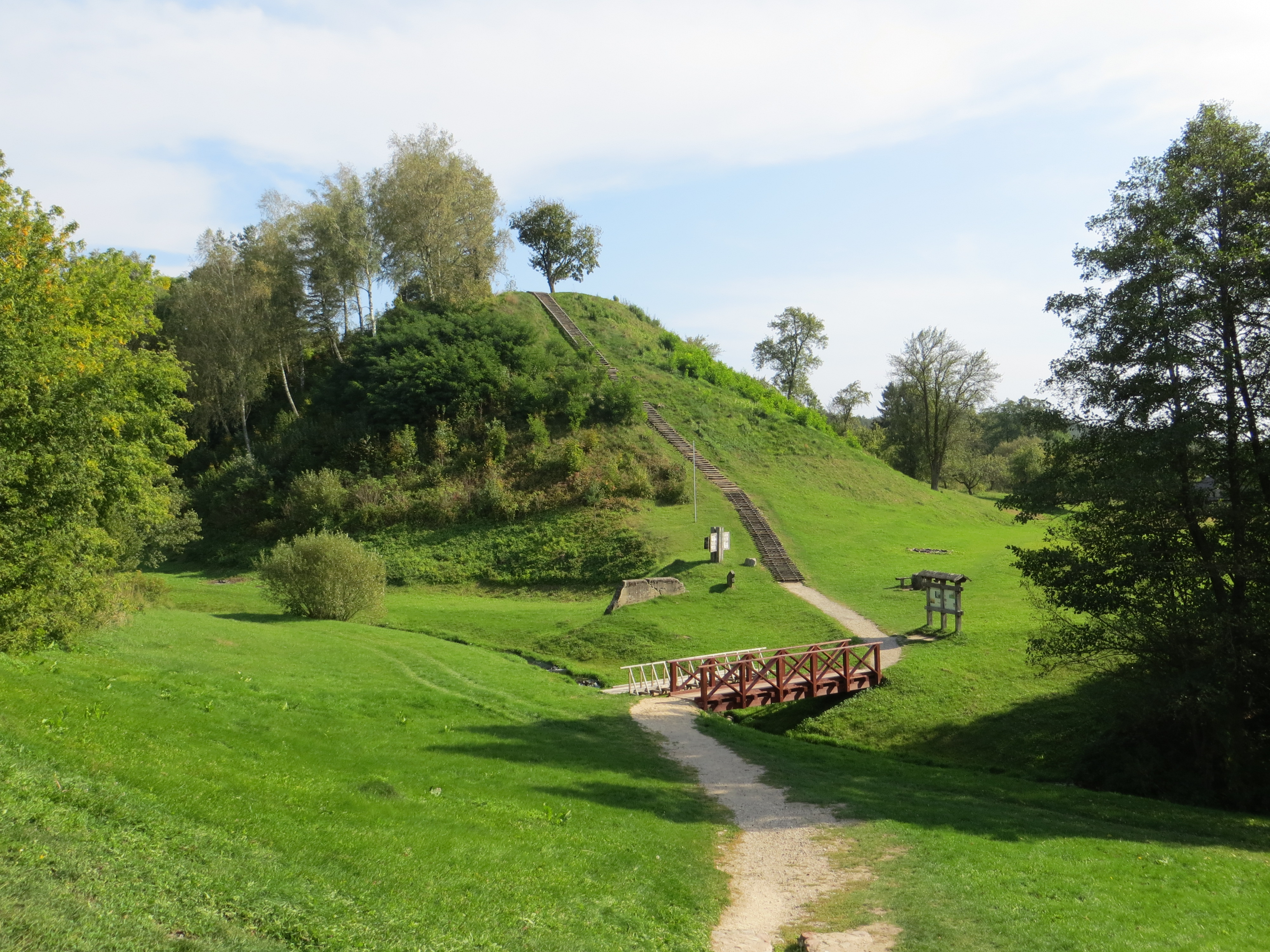
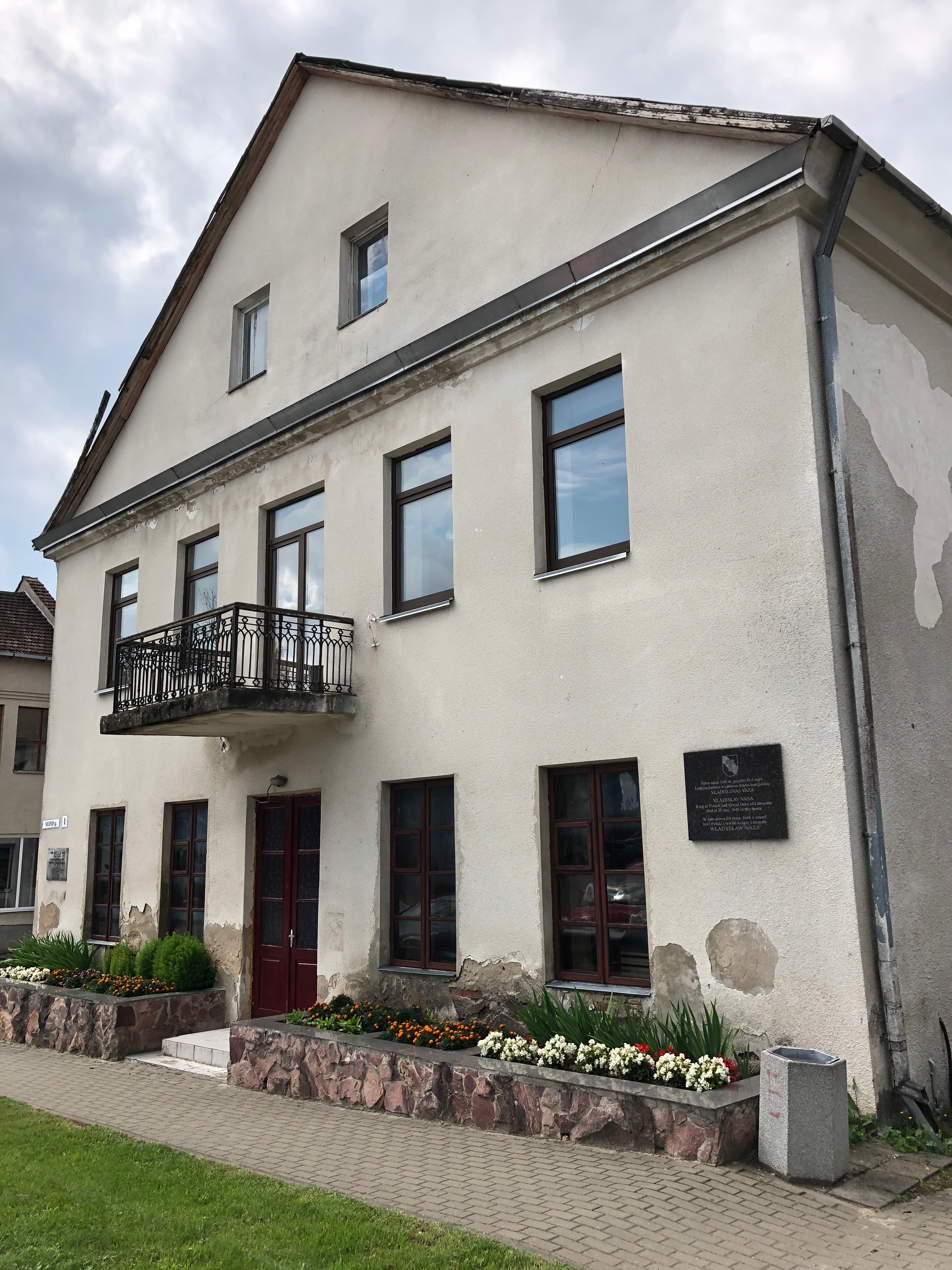
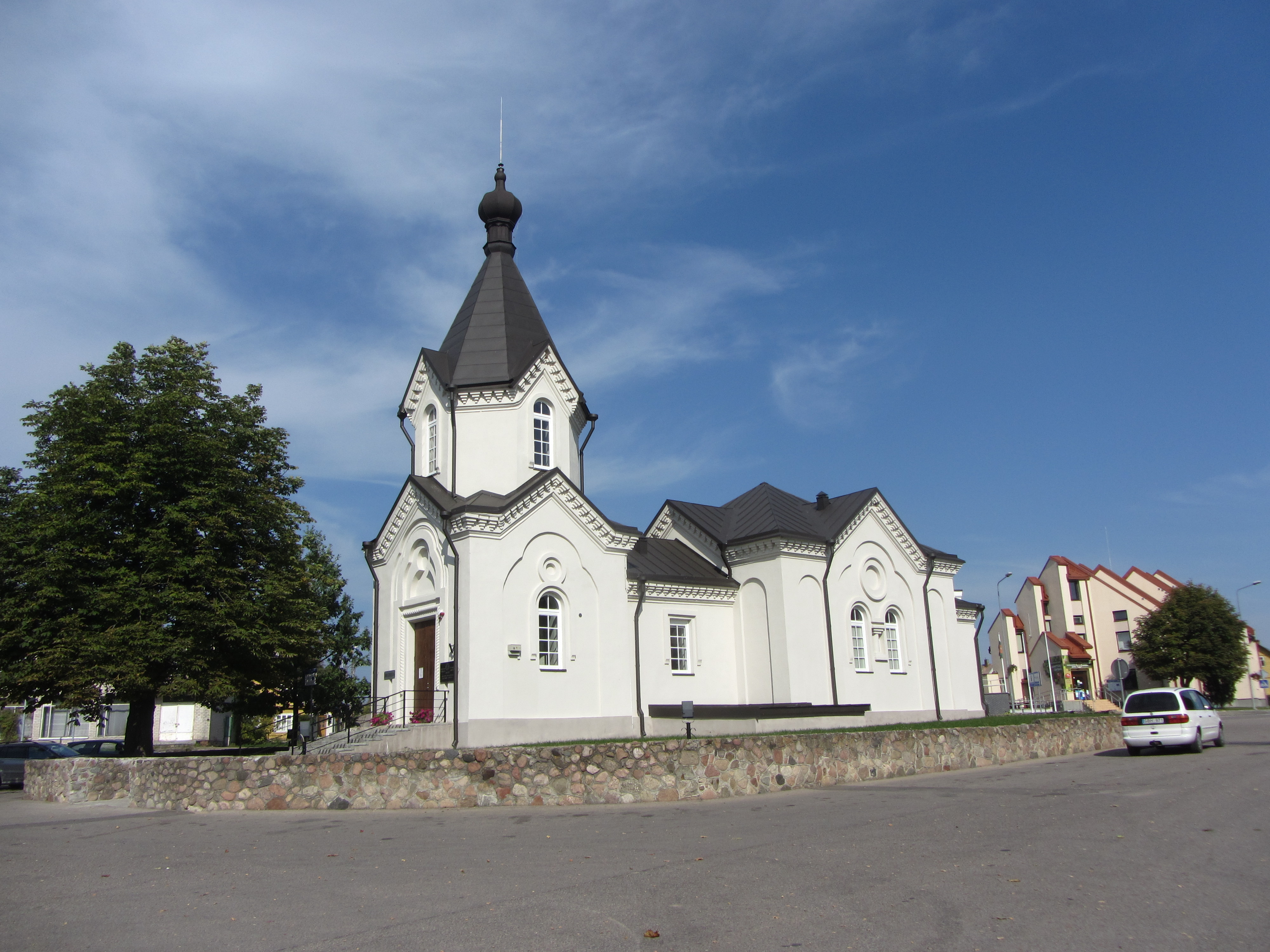
- Aerial view of Merkinė Church of the Assumption of the Blessed Virgin Mary Merkinė Hillfort House where Władysław IV Vasa died Orthodox Church of the Holy Cross, now a museum

- Flag Coat of arms
- Interactive map of Merkinė
- Location of Merkinė
- Coordinates: 54°09′50″N 24°11′10″E
- Country: Lithuania
- Ethnographic region: Dzūkija
- County: Alytus County
- Municipality: Varėna district municipality
- Eldership: Merkinė eldership
- Capital of: Merkinė eldership
- First mentioned: 1359
- Received city rights: 1569

Population (2021)
  - Total: 963
- Time zone: UTC+2 (EET)
  - Summer (DST): UTC+3 (EEST)

Merkinė (also known by several other names) is a small town in Alytus County, Lithuania, located at the confluence of the Neman and Merkys rivers. The town belongs to the Varėna District Municipality and is located about 26 kilometers west of Varėna and 28 kilometers south of Alytus. As of 2021, the town had 963 residents.

Merkinė is one of the oldest settlements in Lithuania. The Merkinė Castle was first mentioned in written sources in 1359. The first settlers inhabited the confluence of Merkys and Nemunas in the 9th-10th century BC, at the end of the Paleolithic. On top of Merkinė hill-fort stood one of the most important Lithuanian castles, built in the 13th century, which guarded against invasions of the Teutonic Order. Merkinė was a part of a strategic triangle - Kaunas - Vilnius - Merkinė, protected with the chains of hillforts and castles. The center of Merkinė town is a state-protected urbanistic monument. Merkinė is an important point of Lithuania's domestic tourism. The town lies entirely in the Dzūkija National Park territory.

== Etymology ==
The name of the town originates from the river, Merkys, which originates from merkti, an appellative word in the Lithuanian language meaning to soak.

The names of the town as it is called or was formerly called in other languages spoken by non-Lithuanian ethnic groups which have lived or live in or around the town include: Polish: Merecz; Yiddish: מערעטש, Meretch; Russian: Меречь.

== History ==
Merkinė was the location of one of many Roman Catholic churches where the priests had to know the Lithuanian language according to the Grand Duke of Lithuania Alexander Jagiellon in 1501

The Merkinė Castle was first mentioned in written sources in 1359, in Novgorod annuals. In 1377 it was mentioned in the chronicles of the Teutonic Order as Merken or Merkenpill. Wooden Merkinė castle became important part of Nemunas defence line castles against Teutonic Order. Castle of Merkinė was burned many times, but was rebuilt again. In 1377, 1394, 1403 Teutonic Order attacked Merkinė castle, raiding and plundering local settlements.

Grand Duke of Lithuania and later King of Poland, Jogaila, ensured city rights for Vilnius in 1387, this document was written in Merkinė castle. First church was built in 1387–1392 in Merkinė castle by Vytautas the Great and Jogaila. After the Battle of Grunwald the town started to grow rapidly. Until receiving Magdeburg rights, several taxation agencies of goods operated here. They were notably the source of rapid growth and increased trade.

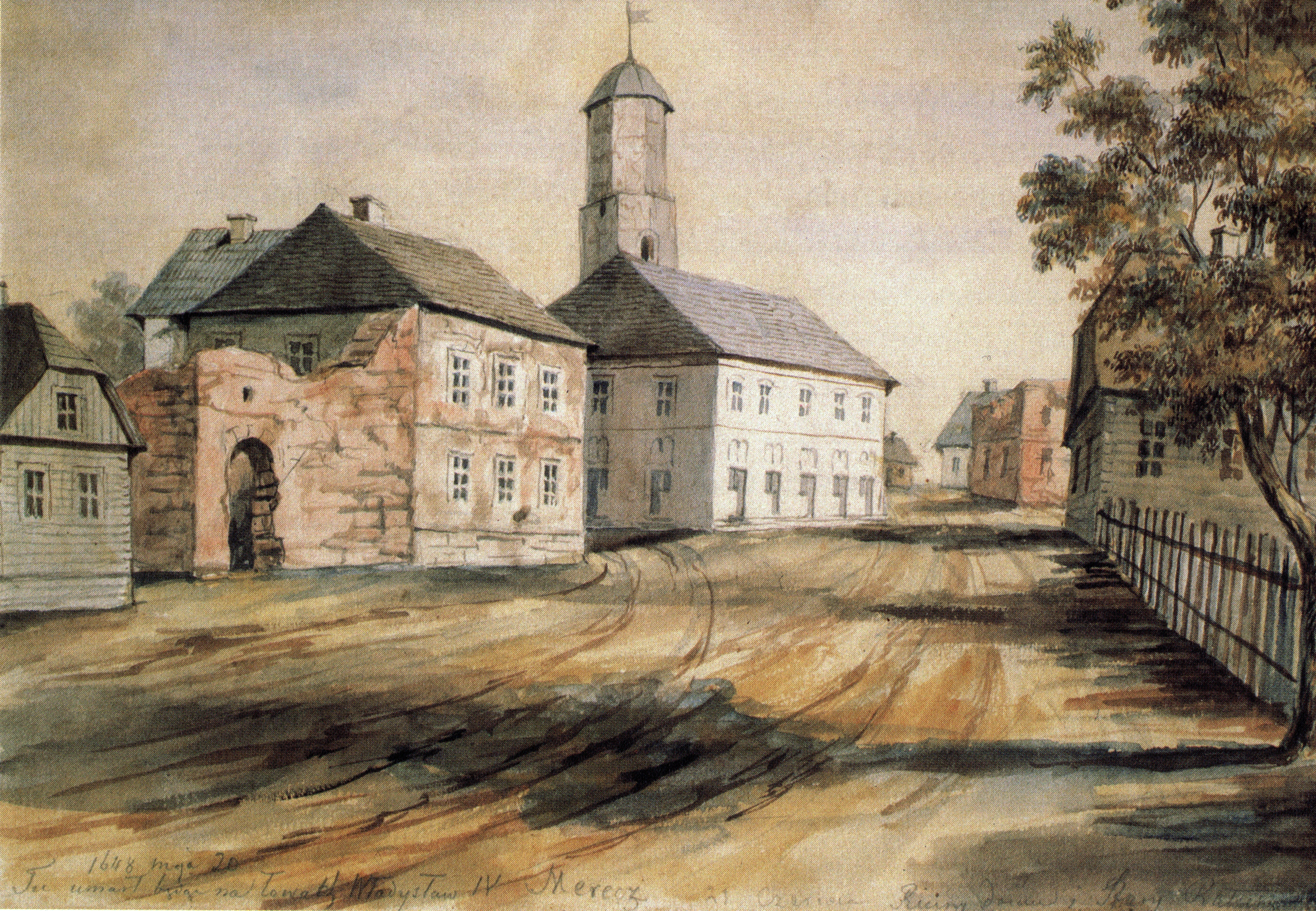
Napoleon Orda. Townhall of Merkinė, 1875–1877

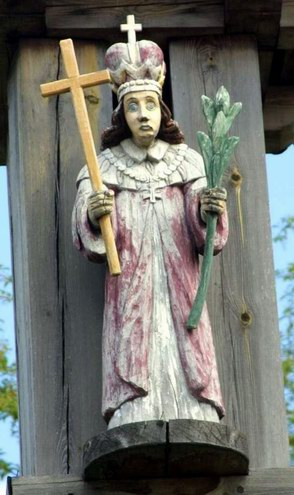
Saint Casimir. Lithuanian traditional sculpture in the centre of Merkinė

On December 7, 1569, the city was granted the Magdeburg rights from the monarch of the Polish–Lithuanian Commonwealth. Towards the end of the 16th century a town hall was built in the centre of the market square and in the first half of the 17th century a Dominican church and monastery were constructed. Merkinė flourished in the 16th-17th centuries – based on the crossroads of important water and land roads, and receiving royal privileges, the town center has become brickwork. The town had three churches, two monasteries and a river port. In historic documents warehouses are mentioned by the river Nemunas, also Merkinė citizens' possessed Lithuanian type of river trade ships – vytinė. In 1633 privileges were issued for the tan and shoemaker guilds, in 1639 – for the guild of tailors. Merkinė became one of the economical, cultural and spiritual centers of the historic land of Dainava. The town was known to be one of the favorite holiday places for the King of Poland and Grand Duke of Lithuania, Władysław IV Vasa, who also died here in 1648.

During the 1654–1667 war with Russia and during the Great Northern War (1700–1721) Merkinė suffered greatly from Russian and Swedish armies and lost its strategic and economic significance. Merkinė was burned again by the Russian army during the 1794 Uprising which tried to liberate the Polish–Lithuanian Commonwealth from Russian influence. In 1794 town inventory river port by Nemunas river is mentioned, also Nemunas and Merkys rivers were evaluated as suitable for navigating. In 19th century documents Merkinė was mentioned as river trade center in which river trade ships were built.

In 1889 banned Lithuanian press was secretly distributed, priests K. Jagminas and J. Bakšys, book carriers K. Barysas, K. Milius and others acted against Polonization and Russification. The beauty of the surroundings of Merkinė and its history was sung by Vincas Krėvė in the book "Dainavos šalies senų žmonių padavimai" (The tales of the old people of the Dainava land)

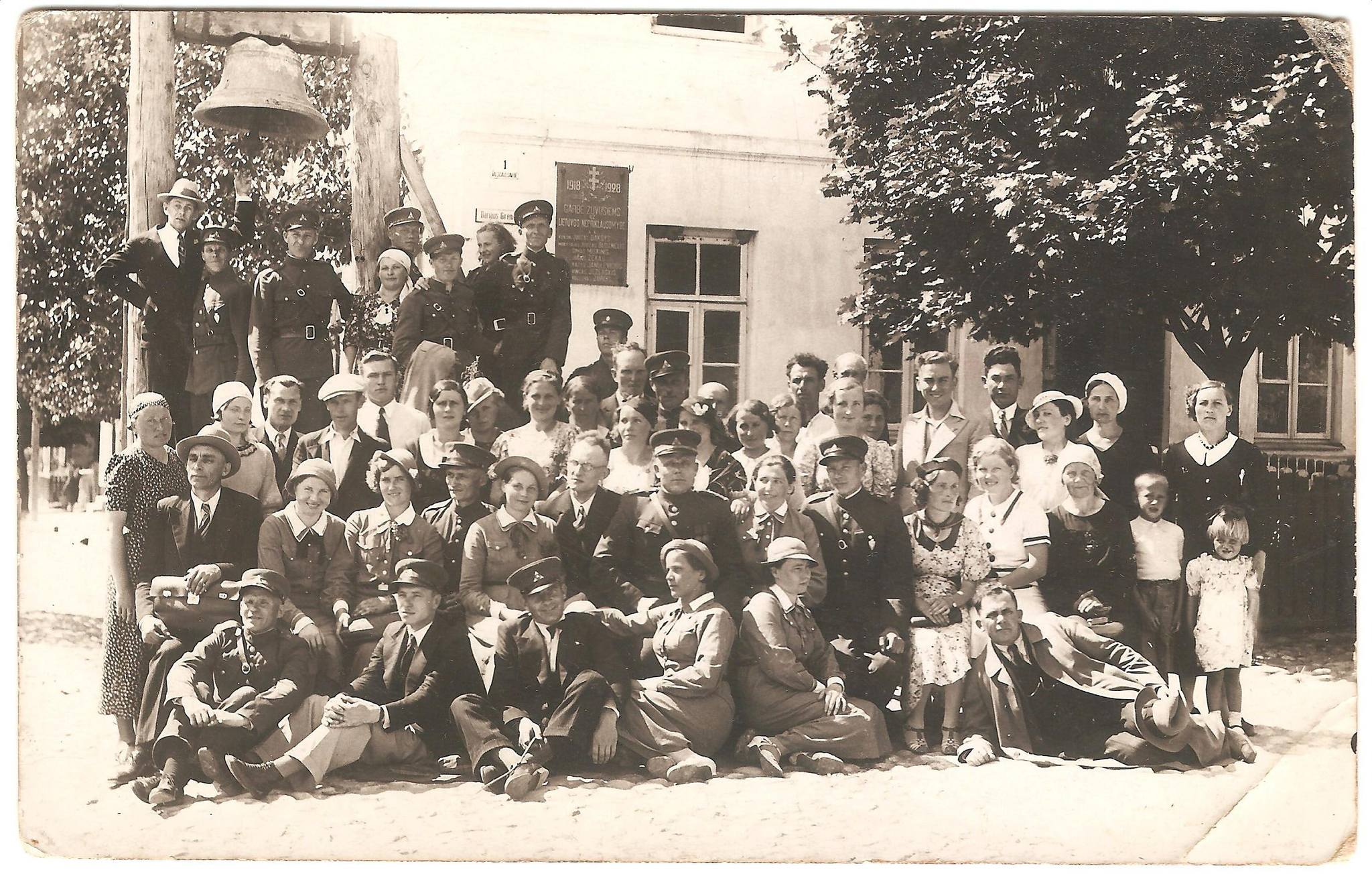
Lithuanian riflemen in front of Władysław IV Vasa's house in 1935

After the Lithuanian Wars of Independence and throughout the interwar, Merkinė was part of an independent Lithuania. After the Soviet occupation in the surroundings of Merkinė Lithuanian partisans of Dainava military district were active. In villages around Merkinė, Soviet destruction battalions burned down 48 homesteads, killed 37 people, 120 were arrested. In December 1945, Lithuanian partisans led by Adolfas Ramanauskas-Vanagas attacked Soviet occupants based in Merkinė, destroyed Soviet office with documents, Soviet militia, post office, homes of Soviet colonists. Merkinė remained in the Lithuanian Soviet Socialist Republic, being part of the Soviet Union until 1990, and then in independent Lithuania.

Merkinė hill of crosses - memorial to honour those who died for freedom of Lithuania was created in 1989.

== Jewish history ==
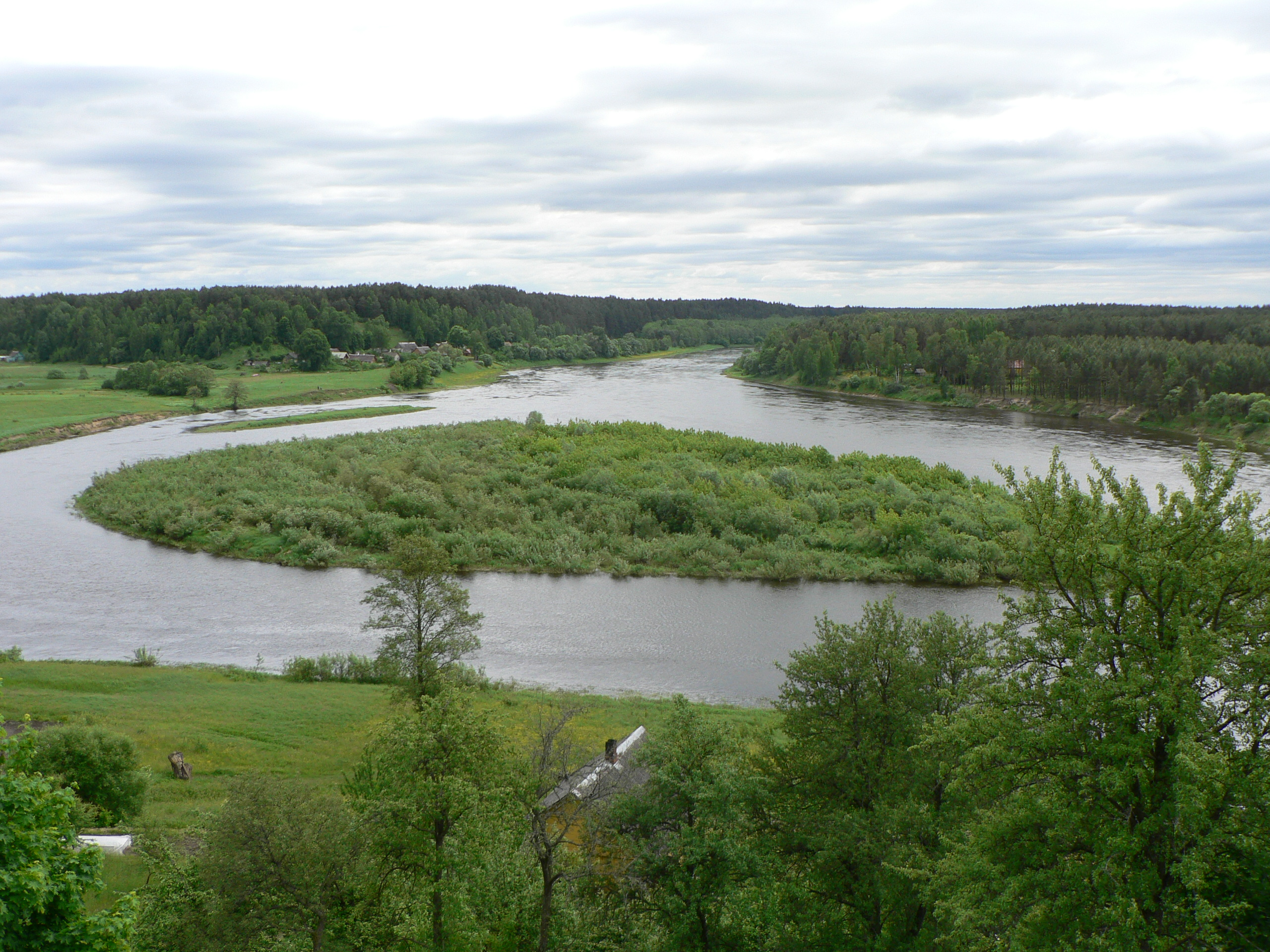
Bend of Nemunas River in Merkinė

The earliest mention of Jews in Merkinė is dated 1539, when a dispute was adjudicated (July 8) between a Jew named Konyuk and a Christian in regard to a debt of the former. In 1551 the Jews of Merkinė were named among those of fourteen other towns to be exempted from the special tax levied upon all inhabitants, with the exception of villagers and Jews, at the Lithuanian diet (Seimas) held in that year on November 27 at Vilnius.

In 1897 Jews made up 73% of the population of the town, and the community numbered 1,900. From the 19th century through the period of Lithuanian independence, the Jewish community was very established and had numerous community organizations and institutions. Following World War I, there was an active Zionist movement and multiple Zionist organizations had offices in the town.

Merkinė produced in the 19th century some noted Hebrew scholars, as Mordecai Melzer, Isaac Margolis (d. New York 1887), and his son Max Margolis, of the University of California.

On September 10, 1941, 854 Jews from Merkinė, as well as from Liepalingis, Liškiava, and Seirijai were shot in a grove near the Jewish cemetery by German Nazis and their Lithuanian collaborators.

A mass grave of Jews killed during the Nazi occupation is in the forest behind the town.

== Economy ==
Merkinė is an important point of domestic tourism. Rural and ecotourism homesteads operate in the region. Merkinė is known as black ceramics center.

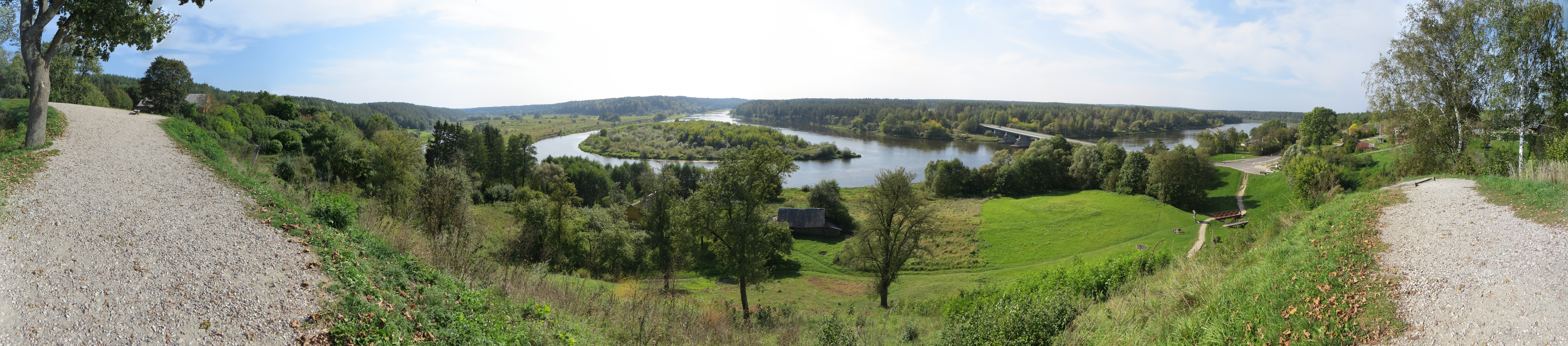
Panoramic view from the hillfort of Merkinė
