= Losing Isaiah =

- Theatrical release poster
- Directed by: Stephen Gyllenhaal
- Screenplay by: Naomi Foner Gyllenhaal
- Based on: Losing Isaiah by Seth Margolis
- Produced by: Naomi Foner Gyllenhaal; Hawk Koch
- Starring: Jessica Lange; Halle Berry; David Strathairn; Cuba Gooding Jr.; Samuel L. Jackson
- Cinematography: Andrzej Bartkowiak
- Edited by: Harvey Rosenstock
- Music by: Mark Isham
- Distributed by: Paramount Pictures
- Release date: March 17, 1995 (United States)
- Running time: 111 minutes
- Country: United States
- Language: English
- Budget: $16 million
- Box office: $7.6 million

Losing Isaiah is a 1995 American drama film starring Jessica Lange and Halle Berry, directed by Stephen Gyllenhaal. It is based on the novel of the same name by Seth Margolis. The screenplay is written by Naomi Foner Gyllenhaal. The original music score is composed by Mark Isham.

== Plot ==
Khaila Richards is an African-American woman struggling with an addiction to crack cocaine. Desperate for drugs, she places her infant son, Isaiah, in a box and leaves him in an alley behind a crack house. Khaila promises to come back for Isaiah but later passes out from a crack cocaine binge. The next day, Isaiah narrowly escapes death by a garbage truck and is rushed to the hospital, where doctors discover that he is also addicted to crack cocaine because of his mother using it while she was pregnant with him. Khaila later awakens and returns to the alley where she left Isaiah and is horrified to discover that he is gone.

While caring for Isaiah, Margaret Lewin, a white social worker, grows increasingly fond of him. Eventually, she adopts Isaiah and brings him home to live with her family, which includes husband Charles, and daughter Hannah. Meanwhile, Khaila is caught shoplifting and sent to rehab, unaware Isaiah is still alive.

Three years later, Khaila successfully completes her treatment and confesses to her case worker that she abandoned Isaiah. Without Khaila's knowledge, the case worker investigates further and discovers that Isaiah is alive and adopted by the Lewins. They hire a lawyer, Kadar Lewis, to contest the adoption and help Khaila regain custody of Isaiah. A custody battle ensues with racial and social issues at the forefront. Kadar argues that Isaiah belongs with his biological mother and that the Lewins lack the cultural awareness to raise an African-American son. The Lewins argue Khaila is unfit due to her past drug addiction, abandoning Isaiah, and limited financial resources. In the end, the judge makes the difficult decision to overturn the adoption and return Isaiah to Khaila's custody, much to the Lewins' horror and sadness.

After weeks pass, Isaiah does not consider Khaila his mother and struggles to adapt to the home she has created for him. He becomes increasingly withdrawn and prone to violent public outbursts. Eventually, Khaila, desperate for Isaiah's happiness, asks Margaret to return to Isaiah's life on a temporary basis; however, she insists she will also continue to be involved for the foreseeable future. The two mothers embrace each other, both proclaiming their equally strong motherly love for Isaiah. The two mothers then begin together playing building blocks with their beloved boy in a classroom.

== Cast ==
- Jessica Lange as Margaret Lewin
- Halle Berry as Khaila Richards
- David Strathairn as Charles Lewin
- Cuba Gooding Jr. as Eddie Hughes
- Samuel L. Jackson as Kadar Lewis
- Daisy Eagan as Hannah Lewin
- Marc John Jefferies as Isaiah
- Joie Susannah Lee as Marie
- Regina Taylor as Gussie
- La Tanya Richardson as Caroline Jones
- Jacqueline Brookes as Judge Silbowitz
- Donovon Ian H. McKnight as Amir
- Rikkia A. Smith as Josie
- Deanna Dunagan as Dr. Goldstein

== Production note ==
Susan Sarandon turned down the role of Margaret Lewin.

== Reception ==
On the review aggregator website Rotten Tomatoes, 45% of 29 critics' reviews are positive, with an average rating of 5.1/10. The website's consensus reads: "Losing Isaiah makes an admirable attempt to tackle complex, worthwhile themes, but loses sight of effective storytelling during a descent into melodrama."
