= Church of the Holy Trinity, Liškiava =

Church building in Lithuania

Church of the Holy Trinity Švč. Trejybės bažnyčia
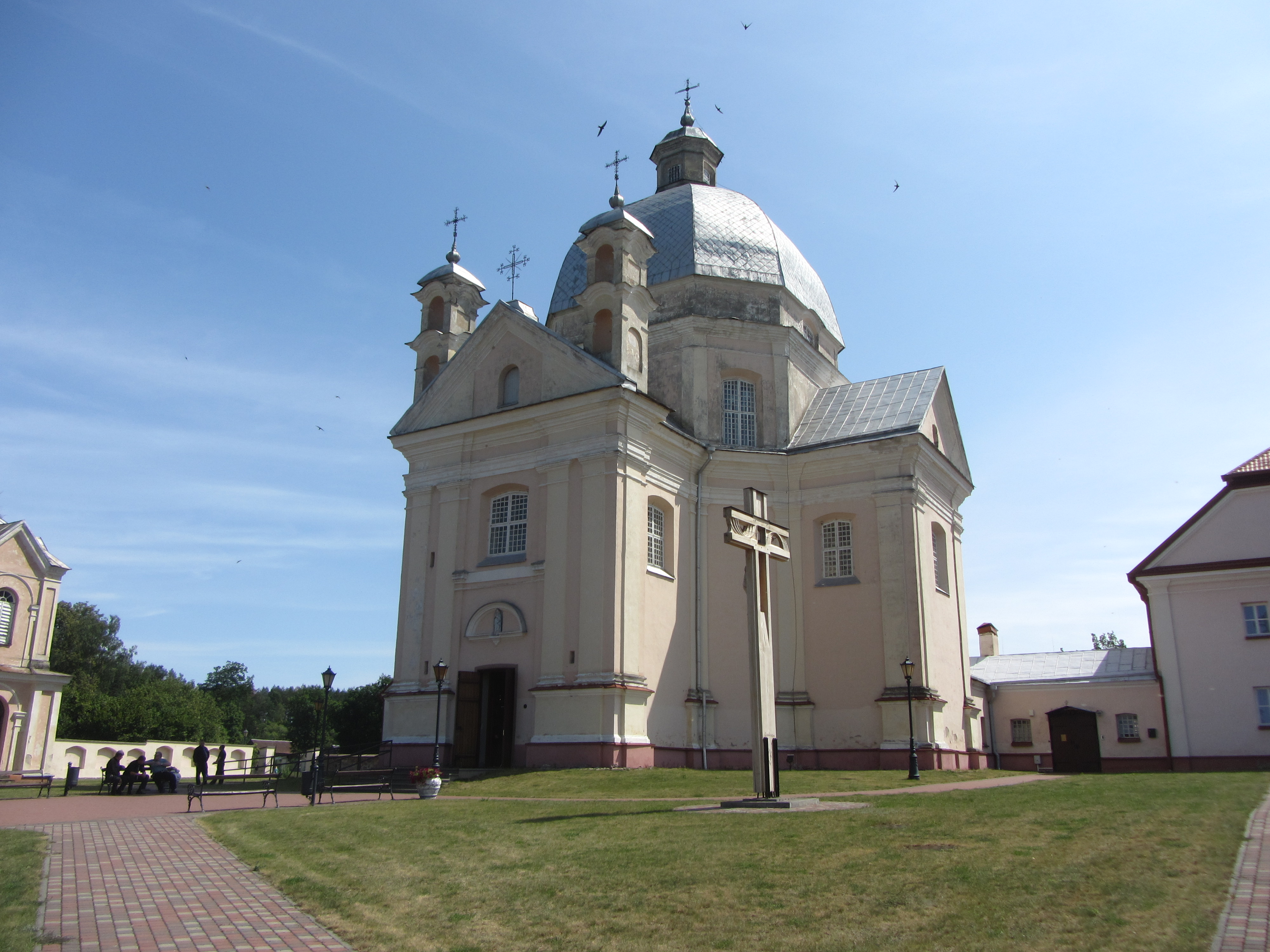
- Façade of Holy Trinity's

Religion
- Affiliation: Roman Catholic
- Leadership: Roman Catholic Diocese of Vilkaviškis
- Year consecrated: 1720

Location
- Location: Liškiava, Lithuania
- Interactive map of Church of the Holy Trinity; Švč. Trejybės bažnyčia
- Coordinates: 54°4′49.58″N 24°3′25.58″E

Architecture
- Type: Church
- Style: Baroque
- Completed: 1720

Specifications
- Dome: 1
- Materials: Plastered masonry

Website
- Liskiavosparapija.lt

The Church of the Holy Trinity (Lithuanian: Švč. Trejybės bažnyčia) is a Roman Catholic church in Liškiava, Lithuania. It is part of the Liškiava Monastery complex.
