= Pearl (given name) =

- The name Pearl is taken from the gemstone, like the earring worn by the girl in the portrait The Girl with a Pearl Earring by Jan Vermeer.
- Pronunciation: purl
- Gender: unisex

Origin
- Origin: English
- Meaning: "pearl"
- Region of origin: English

Pearl is a unisex given name derived from the English word pearl, a hard, roundish object produced within the soft tissue of a living, shelled mollusk. Pearls are commonly used in jewelry-making. The name has a history of usage among Jews. Pearl is used as an Anglicization of the Yiddish name Perle. Pearl is also a common Jewish surname. Usage of the name for girls may also have been inspired by the name Margaret, which means "pearl". Pearl came into wider popular use in the Anglosphere along with other gemstone names used for girls during the late Victorian Era.

== Symbolism ==
The pearl is the birthstone for the month of June. Pearls have been associated with innocence and modesty. Because it comes from the sea, it also has associations with the moon and with water. Pearls are also traditionally considered appropriate jewelry for debutantes and brides.

The pearl also has Christian religious symbolism. In Nathaniel Hawthorne's 1850 novel The Scarlet Letter, heroine Hester Prynne names her illegitimate daughter Pearl because the child is "of great price, purchased with all she had, her mother's only treasure." The passage refers to the Parable of the Pearl in the New Testament. The Hymn of the Pearl is a passage found in the apocryphon Acts of Thomas. The gates to Heaven are also commonly pictured as made of pearl.

== History of female usage ==
It was among the 50 most popular names for girls born in the United States between 1880 and 1911, remained among the top 100 most popular names for girls between 1911 and 1926 and among the top 500 most popular names for girls in the United States until 1960. It was last ranked among the top 1,000 names for girls born in the United States in 1986 before it returned to the top 1,000 in 2007, when it was ranked at No. 993. It has continued to rank among the top 1,000 names for American girls through 2023. The name was the 223rd most common name for women and girls in the United States in the 1990 census. The name has also been among the top 1,000 names used for girls in the United Kingdom since 1996 and among the top 300 most used names for British girls since 2013. It was among the top one hundred names used for girls in Canada between 1920 and 1932. It has again increased in usage in Canada and ranked among the top five hundred names for newborn girls there in 2023. It was also among the top one hundred names for newborn girls in New Zealand at different times between 1900 and 1925. Authors Pamela Redmond Satran and Linda Rosenkrantz noted in their 2007 book The Baby Name Bible that Pearl is in fashion again with hipster parents in the United States.

== History of male usage ==
The name Pearl was among the top 1,000 names given to boys in the United States between 1880 and 1939. The American Western author Zane Grey may have been given his little-used first name of Pearl in 1872 in reference to a newspaper article that described Queen Victoria's mourning dress as "pearl grey". American strikebreaker Pearl Bergoff was given the name in the 1870s because his mother had wanted a girl.

== Women ==
- Pearl Aday (born 1975), American singer-songwriter.
- Pearl Bailey (1918–1990), American singer and actress
- Pearl Berg (1909–2024), American supercentenarian
- Pearl Bernstein Max (1904–1999), American city official
- Pearl Buck (1892–1973), American author and novelist
- Pearl Butler, 1960s American country music singer
- Pearl Chanda (born 1994), English actress
- Pearl Charles (born 1991), American singer-songwriter
- Pearl Connor-Mogotsi (1924–2005), Trinidadian-born theatrical and literary agent
- Pearl Fu (born 1941), Chinese-American community leader
- Pearl Hart (1871–1955), Canadian-born outlaw of the American Old West
- Pearl Jansen (born 1950), South African singer and beauty pageant
- Pearl Lowe (born 1970), English fashion and textiles designer and singer-songwriter
- Pearl Mackie (born 1987), British actress
- Pearl Padamsee (1931–2000), Indian actress, director and producer
- Pearl Powell (1909–2004), Australian memoirist
- Pearl Prescod (1920–1966), Tobagonian actress and singer
- Pearl Primus (1919–1994), American dancer, choreographer and anthropologist.
- John Oliver Hobbes (pen name of Pearl Mary Teresa Richards; 1867–1906), Anglo-American novelist and dramatist
- Pearl Slattery (born 1989), Irish footballer
- Pearl Mitsu Sonoda (1918–2015), American ichthyologist and biologist
- Pearl Starr (1868–1925), American pimp and businesswoman
- Pearl Thrasher (1917–1972), American politician
- Pearl Thusi (born 1988), South African actress, model, and presenter
- Pearl Turner, American female child who has been missing since 1923
- Pearl White (1889–1938), American actress

== Men ==
- Pearl Bergoff (1875 or 1878–1947), American strikebreaker
- Pearl Chambers (died 1941), American lumberman after whom the Pearl and Eva Chambers House was named
- Pearl Fryar (born 1939), American topiary artist
- Pearl Fuller (1881–1908), American football player and coach
- Zane Grey (real name Pearl Grey; 1872–1939), American author and dentist
- Pearl T. Haskell (1868–1919), American football coach, physician, and politician
- Pearl Meyer, owner of the store for which the Pearl and Bess Meyer House was built and named
- Pearl V Puri (born 1989), Indian actor
- Pearl Rardin (1886–1968), American football coach and World War I service member
- Pearl Thompson (born 1957), English musician and artist who was born Paul Thompson
- Pearl Webster (1889–1918), American baseball player
- Pearl Welshimer (1873–1957), American theologian

== Nickname or stage name ==
- Dwayne "Pearl" Washington (1964–2016), American basketball player
- Janis Joplin (1943–1970), American singer-songwriter, nicknamed Pearl
- Pearl (drag queen) (Matthew James Lent, born 1990)
- Pearl (singer) (Jinju, born 1980), South Korean singer
- Earl Monroe (born 1944), or "Earl The Pearl", American basketball player

== Fictional characters ==
- Pearl (One Piece), a character in the One Piece manga
- Pearl (Steven Universe), a character from the animated series Steven Universe
- Pearl (X), fictional character in the X film series
- Pearl (drag queen), a competitor on season 7 of RuPaul's Drag Race
- Pearl Fey, an Ace Attorney character
- Pearl Forrester, a Mystery Science Theater 3000 character
- Pearl Krabs, a SpongeBob SquarePants character
- Pearl Houzuki, a character from the Splatoon franchise

== Variants ==
- Gyöngyi (Hungary)
- Helmi (Finnish)
- Pearla (English)
- Pearle (English)
- Pearlie (English)
- Pearlina (English)
- Pearline (English)
- Perla (Italian), (Spanish)
- Perle (French), (Norwegian)
- Perlette (French)
- Perley (English)
- Perly (English)
- Perlezenn (Breton)
- Perlie (English)
- Perline (French)
- Perlita (Spanish)
- Πέρλα (Perla) (Greek)

== See also ==
- Pearl (surname)
- Lu'lu', Arabic name meaning 'pearl'
