= Allison Margolin =

American lawyer

- Education: Columbia University (BA); Harvard University (JD)
- Occupation: Lawyer
- Years active: 2002–present
- Known for: Marijuana Advocate & Criminal Defense Attorney
- Website: allisonmargolin.com

Allison Margolin is an American attorney and author of Jury Nullifications and Reasonable Doubt and Just Dope: A Leading Attorney's Personal Journey Inside the War on Drugs.

== Life ==
Margolin is based in Los Angeles, California, but practices law throughout California. Margolin handles matters in all counties including Siskiyou County and Stanislaus County where she currently practices criminal defense, code enforcement defense, and water law. Margolin has been hired in other states including Utah, Nevada, and Oklahoma, and has currently been profiled for her work in the Asian American discrimination case, Lo et al v. County of Siskiyou et al.

Margolin is known for her work as a criminal defense attorney, and early on became known for her advocacy for drug legalization and criminal justice reform. She is the daughter of Bruce Margolin, one of the first lawyers to champion efforts to decriminalize marijuana in the 1970s. In 1999 Margolin completed her undergraduate at Columbia University where she graduated magna cum laude in Political Science and obtained a certificate in Creative Writing, and taught a section of Judicial Politics, in connection with receiving the Arthur Rose Teaching Assistant-ship. She then entered Harvard Law School. Her Harvard application essay argued that all drugs should be legalized. Margolin graduated from Harvard with a J.D. in 2002. Margolin began her legal career representing people with terminal diseases who were facing criminal charges for marijuana activity. By 2008, she had a reputation for getting cases dismissed, and for recovering marijuana plants that had been seized by police. She has represented growers and distributors in marijuana cases in both state and federal court, including the Supreme Court of California and the United States Court of Appeals for the Ninth Circuit.

She initially gained notoriety for "unorthodox ads" that proclaimed her "L.A.'s dopest attorney". Margolin was one of the first attorneys to advertise her law practice on YouTube. She is a founding partner of Allison Margolin PLC and the law firm Margolin & Lawrence, where she practiced regulatory and business law, as well as federal and state criminal defense.

Margolin is also the author of Jury Nullifications and Reasonable Doubt, published by Phoenix Books in January 2008. As a cannabis lawyer, she is an advocate for regulations that remedy the effects of the drug war and promote social equity. From 2018 to 2023 she was named a SuperLawyer by Thomson Reuters and was selected to Rising Stars from 2010 to 2012 and 2015 to 2017.
