= Bruce Margolin =

American lawyer

- Born: September 11, 1941 (age 84); Cleveland, Ohio, U.S.
- Education: Southwestern Law School
- Occupation: Attorney
- Years active: 1967–present
- Spouse: Tara Margolin (2012–2013)
- Children: 4, including Allison Margolin
- Website: margolinforcongress.com

Bruce Margolin (born September 11, 1941) is an American criminal defense attorney who specializes in marijuana and drug laws. Since 1973, he has served as the executive director of the Los Angeles chapter of NORML (National Organization for the Reform of Marijuana Laws). He is the writer of the Margolin Guide to Marijuana Law.

== Biography ==
Margolin was born in Cleveland, Ohio and moved to Los Angeles, California as a young child. He began his practice when he was 25 years old, after earning his law degree from Southwestern Law School in 1966. In 1970, Margolin ran for California State Assembly, losing by 5 percentage points. In 1971, he traveled to India with writer and spiritual leader Baba Ram Dass. Since he returned, he has remained a lawyer. In 1999, he was awarded the Criminal Defense Attorney of the Year award by the Century City Bar Association. Margolin unsuccessfully ran for governor in the 2003 California gubernatorial recall election. Margolin planned to legalize marijuana and free all marijuana prisoners in the state of California if he were to win the election.

Margolin's daughter Allison has also established a reputation as a marijuana lawyer.
