= Tara Eden Pearl =

American entrepreneur and real estate executive

Tara Eden Pearl is an American entrepreneur, business strategist and real estate executive who has founded several companies. She designed and manufactured a line of furniture pieces, distributed through wholesale channels as well as her own retail chain stores. Edie Cohen of the Chicago Tribune credited her with launching a multimillion-dollar futon industry in the United States, and creating what has been called the "Western" or "American Futon"—prior to her 21st birthday. In addition to her other business interests, Pearl is currently an executive and a founder of Universal Medical Access Corporation, a Palm Beach, Florida-based health information technology firm.

== Early life ==
Born in 1961 in Chicago, Illinois, Pearl grew up in Palm Beach, Florida where she attended the Palm Beach Day Academy. Pearl's entrepreneurial education started at an early age. Her grandparents, George and Suzetta Small, owned a large clothing and design manufacturing business with factories in New York and Florida. Her grandmother, Suzetta Small, was also a prolific and accomplished entrepreneur. Small was among the first female general contractors in Florida, and founder of several companies, including consulting and brokerage firm Palm Beach Real Estate, Inc., Contemporary Construction, the Small Museum and The Look, a clothing design and manufacturing company that operated in Florida and Puerto Rico. Suzetta Small had created the businesses with her daughter, Phyllis “Honey” Small, and the women involved young Tara in the running of the businesses throughout her childhood.

During school vacations, Pearl served as the part-time activities director for the Breakers Hotel.

== Futon business ==
Pearl enrolled at Clark University in Worcester, Mass. in 1977. A furniture piece she designed for her own dorm room, an adaptation of a traditional Japanese sleeping mat, became so popular and sought after that by her sophomore year, she made a decision to leave school and open her first home furnishings factory in Chicago. Prior to her 21st birthday, the Chicago Tribune had credited Pearl with creating the "American-style" futon and launching the futon industry in the U.S. During the same year, the Chicago Tribune called Tara Pearl one of “86 People to Watch in 1986,” along with Donald Rumsfeld. In her first year of manufacturing futons, her firm Natural Design Inc. grew so quickly she was forced to expand into three new factories in rapid succession. Pearl's manufacturing innovations established Natural Design as "the leading futon and futon furniture supplier in the country." Her analytical approach to marketing was described and used as the subject of a problem in a college-level statistics text.

Her first retail store was located in Evanston, Illinois. Eventually, this portfolio expanded to include seven stores in the Chicago area. Natural Design was sold to its employees in the early 1990s.

In 1987, Pearl launched Futon Furnishings and Euro 2000 brands, for which she designed multifunctional furniture for urban living, for both wholesale and retail markets.

== Management consulting ==
With two of her business partners, Thomas Parkinson and Dov Kahana, Tara Pearl subsequently established a consulting firm, The Pearl Group Inc. It specialized in nurturing small companies with large growth potential by offering strategic management and financing assistance.

The Pearl Group exists today and has worked with firms in medical devices, information technology, advanced 3-D medical imaging, heavy industry, shipping, retail, clothing, fine arts authentication and valuation, and the food and beverage industry. Clients included: K-Mart, Art Guard, Hart Schaffner & Marx, Corrugated Pallet Corp., North American Mortar and Holographic Industries.

Pearl was a featured speaker at the Northwestern University's Kellogg School of Management on entrepreneurship and related topics and a served as referee for graduate student presentations at the Keller Graduate School of Management.

== Real estate career ==
Pearl became licensed as a Realtor in Illinois in the early 1990s and later as a Broker in Florida. The Palm Beach Daily News credited her with achieving the highest price per square foot for a Palm Beach condominium in 2007.

She was the recipient of 1995 and 1996 "Outstanding Sales Awards" by the Chicago Association of Realtors, as well as achievement awards from Koenig & Strey Institute and the Kahn Realty Companies, in recognition of her accomplishments in real estate marketing.

Pearl is also Managing Partner of Three Pearls Ltd., a real estate holding company with properties in Palm Beach and surrounding locales. She also developed several themed restaurants which have been widely emulated, including R-Kitchen in Lake Worth, Florida.

She is a member of the International Real Estate Federation (FIABCI), as well as national and local industry groups.

== Humanitarian work ==
In 2005 Hurricane Katrina caused widespread loss of lives and property in Florida and New Orleans. Pearl assembled an aid organization called Hurricane Relief Now, which was recognized by the Federal Emergency Management Agency (FEMA) and given clearance to land at the closest rural airports to areas of need. She mobilized her Palm Beach friends, associates and local businesses to donate time, money, goods and private planes to organize the aid and ship supplies, dispatching 17 private aircraft and 4 tractor trailers loaded with more than 100,000 pounds of goods within the first two weeks of the disaster.

== Media work ==
Pearl is a frequent contributor to national and international media. ABC, BBC, CBS, Frankfurter Allgemein, RTL, The Boston Globe She was featured in the NBC/CNBC special report: Scam of the Century: Bernie Madoff's Crime and Punishment. Pearl was host of a weekly feature with Roxanne Stein and John Favole on NBC station WPTV, West Palm Beach, titled "Expert Tours Top Mansions." She was also quoted in other newspapers and a 2009 book about the Madoff scandal
