= Helen Margolis =

British physicist

Helen Sarah Margolis
- Education: University of Oxford
- Scientific career
- Workplaces: National Physical Laboratory (United Kingdom)
- Thesis: Studies of highly ionized atoms using an electron beam ion trap (1994)

Helen Sarah Margolis MBE is a British physicist who is a Senior Fellow and Head of Science for Time and Frequency at the National Physical Laboratory. Her research considers the use of optical frequency metrology using femtosecond combs.

== Early life and education ==
Margolis studied physics at the University of Oxford. She completed her undergraduate and graduate training at Pembroke College, where she tested theories in quantum electrodynamics. In particular, she made use of electron beams to trap highly ionised atoms. After graduating, she remained at Oxford as a postdoctoral researcher, during which time she started working with the National Physical Laboratory.

== Research and career ==
Margolis joined the National Physical Laboratory in 1998. She developed femtosecond combs for optical frequency metrology. Her research looks to create highly accurate optical atomic clocks using trapped ions. She serves as coordinator of the European project Robust Optical Clocks for International Timescales (ROCIT). In this capacity, she seeks to make optical clocks more robust, such that they can run reliably, reproducibly and unattended for extended periods of time.

In 2017, Margolis was made visiting professor at the University of Oxford. Working with Mark Walport, Margolis helped to draft the Blackett review, The Quantum Age: technological opportunities. She was appointed a Member of the British Empire in 2019 for her service to metrology.

== Selected publications ==
- Margolis HS; Barwood GP; Huang G; Klein HA; Lea SN; Szymaniec K; Gill P (1 November 2004). "Hertz-level measurement of the optical clock frequency in a single 88Sr+ ion". Science. 306 (5700): 1355–1358. doi:10.1126/science.1105497. ISSN 0036-8075. PMID 15550666. Wikidata Q33209081.
- Rachel M. Godun; P B R Nisbet-Jones; J M Jones; et al. (17 November 2014). "Frequency ratio of two optical clock transitions in 171Yb+ and constraints on the time variation of fundamental constants". Physical Review Letters. 113 (21) 210801. arXiv:1407.0164. doi:10.1103/physrevlett.113.210801. ISSN 0031-9007. PMID 25479482. Wikidata Q55058766.
- P Delva; J Lodewyck; Sławomir Bilicki; et al. (2 June 2017). "Test of Special Relativity Using a Fiber Network of Optical Clocks". Physical Review Letters. 118 (22) 221102. arXiv:1703.04426. doi:10.1103/physrevlett.118.221102. ISSN 0031-9007. PMID 28621983. Wikidata Q50581635.
- Margolis HS; Gill P (21 August 2015) "Least-squares analysis of clock frequency comparison data to deduce optimized frequency and frequency ratio values" Metrologia 52 628. doi:10.1088/0026-1394/52/5/628
