= Seth Margolis =

American author of fiction

Seth Margolis is an American author of fiction. In 1995, one of his books was made into a feature film called Losing Isaiah, starring Jessica Lange and Halle Berry. In 2006, he released Closing Costs, a story about the New York City real estate market. He has also written a number of New York Times articles about travel and entertainment.

== Bibliography ==
- Losing Isaiah. Hyperion Books. 1993. ISBN 9781562828073.
- False Faces. St. Martin's Press. 1991. ISBN 9780312058180.
- Vanishing Act. St. Martin's Press. 1993. ISBN 9780312087708.
- Perfect Angel: A Novel of Psychological Suspense. Avon Books. 1997. ISBN 9780380973118.
- The Hypnotist. Headline. 1997. ISBN 9780747254690.
- Closing Costs. St. Martin's. 2006. ISBN 9780312353681.
- Takeover. iUniverse. 2008. ISBN 9780595531387.
- Disillusions. Diversion. 2015. ISBN 978-1682300954.
- Semper Sonnet. Diversion. 2016. ISBN 9781682300565.
- President's Day. Diversion. 2017. ISBN 9781682306970.
