= Max Margolis =

American linguist, and historian

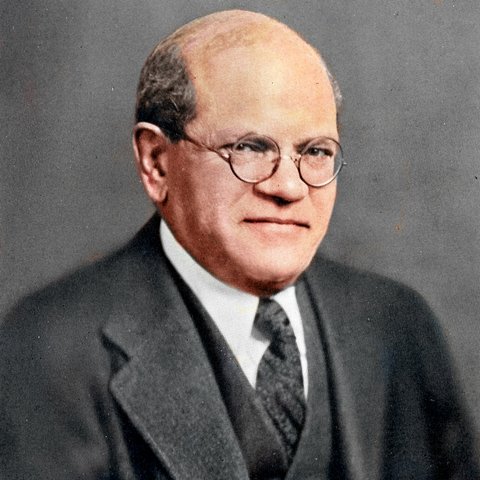
Image of Max Leopold Margolis

Max Leopold Margolis (born in Meretz (Merkinė), Vilna Governorate; October 15, 1866 – April 2, 1932 in Philadelphia) was a Lithuanian Jewish and American philologist. Son of Isaac Margolis; educated at the elementary school of his native town, the Leibniz gymnasium, Berlin, and Columbia University, New York City (Ph.D. 1891). In 1891 he was appointed to a fellowship in Semitic languages at Columbia University, and from 1892 to 1897 he was instructor, and later assistant professor, of Hebrew language and Biblical exegesis at the Hebrew Union College of Cincinnati. In 1897 he became assistant professor of Semitic languages in the University of California; in 1898, associate professor; and from 1902 the head of the Semitic department. When Dropsie College was formed in 1909, Margolis was chosen as Professor of Biblical Philology, remaining at Dropsie College until his death in 1932.

Margolis was named editor-in-chief of the Jewish Publication Society's translation of the Bible into English, the finished product being published in 1917. He served as president of the Society of Biblical Literature as editor of the Journal of Biblical Literature (1914–1921). He was also editor of the Journal of the American Oriental Society. He was elected to the American Philosophical Society in 1927.

== Works (selected) ==
- "The Columbia College MS. of Megilla", New York, 1892
- "Notes on Semitic Grammar", parts i.-iii., in "Hebraica" ("American Journal of Semitic Languages and Literatures"), 1894, 1896, 1902
- "The Theology of the Old Prayer-Book", in "Year Book of the Central Conference of American Rabbis", 1897
- "The Theological Aspect of Reformed Judaism", Baltimore, 1904
- A History of the Jewish People, Philadelphia: Jewish Publication Society of America, 1927. (with Alexander Marx)
