= Rafał Perl =

Polish diplomat

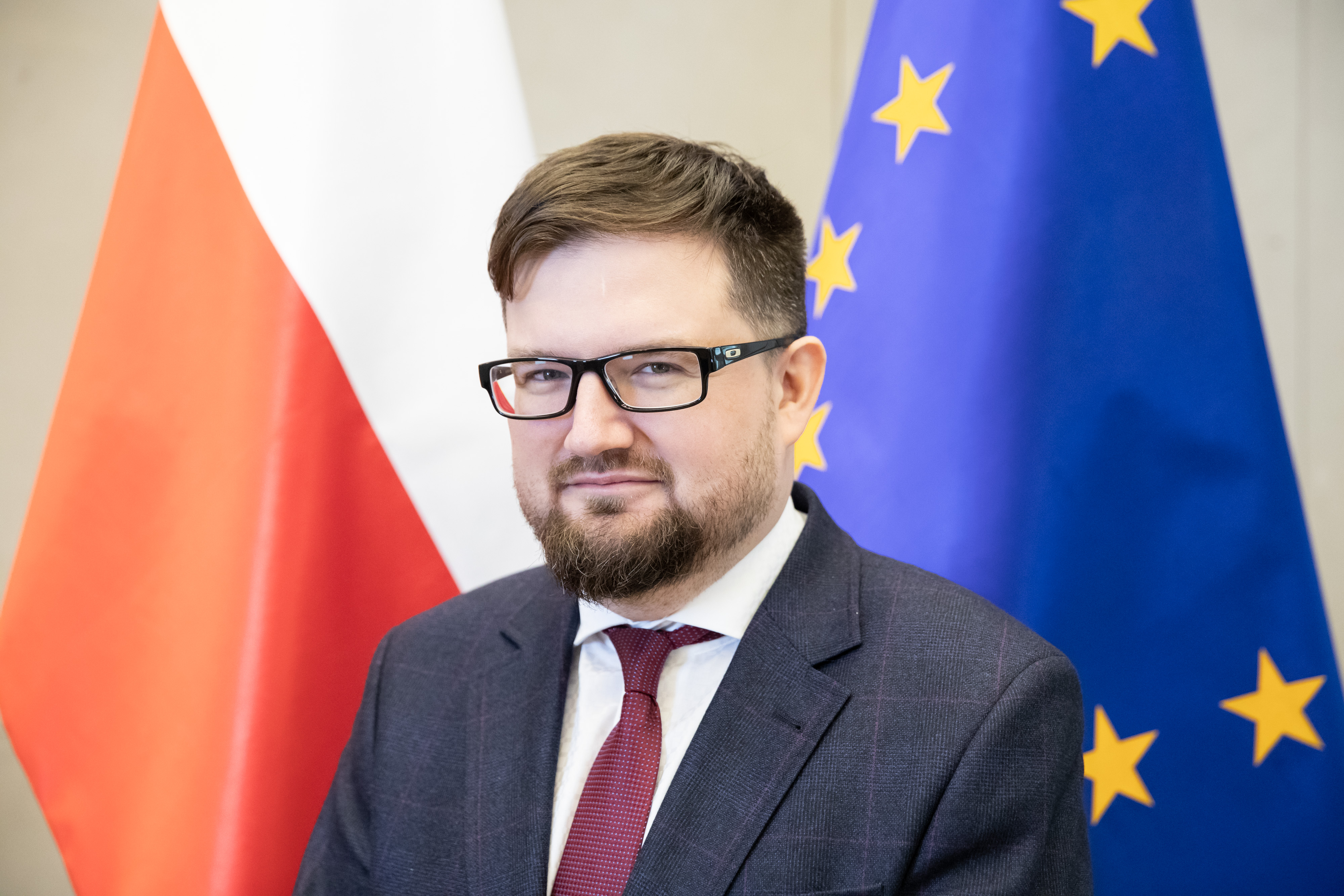

Poland Ambassador to Serbia
- In office 16 July 2020 – July 2024
- Preceded by: Tomasz Niegodzisz

Personal details
- Born: 20 May 1981 (age 45) Szczecin
- Spouse: Anna Perl
- Children: 1 daughter
- Education: University of Szczecin
- Profession: Diplomat

Rafał Paweł Perl (born 20 May 1981 in Szczecin) is a Polish diplomat, from 2020 to 2024 ambassador to Serbia.

== Education ==
Perl graduated from political science at the University of Szczecin. He was studying also at the University of Liège Faculty of Law and at the University of Lausanne Faculty of Social and Political Sciences. He finished with best results the Diplomatic Academy of the Ministry of Foreign Affairs, being also trained at the National School of Public Administration, and the Centre d'études européennes de Strasbourg. He has been alumni of the Polish Children's Fund during his high school, as well.

Besides Polish, Perl speaks fluently English, French, and communicatively Serbian languages.

== Career ==
In 2005, he began his career in diplomacy. Between 2006 and 2011, he was working at the departments for relations with European countries. He was responsible for relations with Albania, Bosnia and Herzegovina, Croatia, Macedonia. From 2007 to 2008, he was also Polish deputy representative at the board of the European Agency for Reconstruction in Thessaloniki. He was OSCE election observer in Bosnia-Herzegovina in Montenegro. Between 2011 and 2015 he was serving as First Secretary and Counsellor press chief at the Polish embassy in Washington. In 2015, he became head of unit at the Minister of Foreign Affairs Secretariat, being promoted to deputy director, and then director of this 50-person department. He was engaged in organizing the Belgrade, Tirana, and Skopje conferences. On 28 January 2020 he was appointed Poland ambassador to Serbia. Due to the COVID-19 pandemic he took the post after almost six months, on 16 July 2020. On 19 August 2020, he presented his letter of credence to president Aleksandar Vučić. He ended his mission in July 2024.

== Private life ==
Rafał Perl is married to Anna Perl who is also a diplomat, with a daughter.

== Honours ==
- Silver Cross of Merit (2019)
