= Liškiava =

- Village
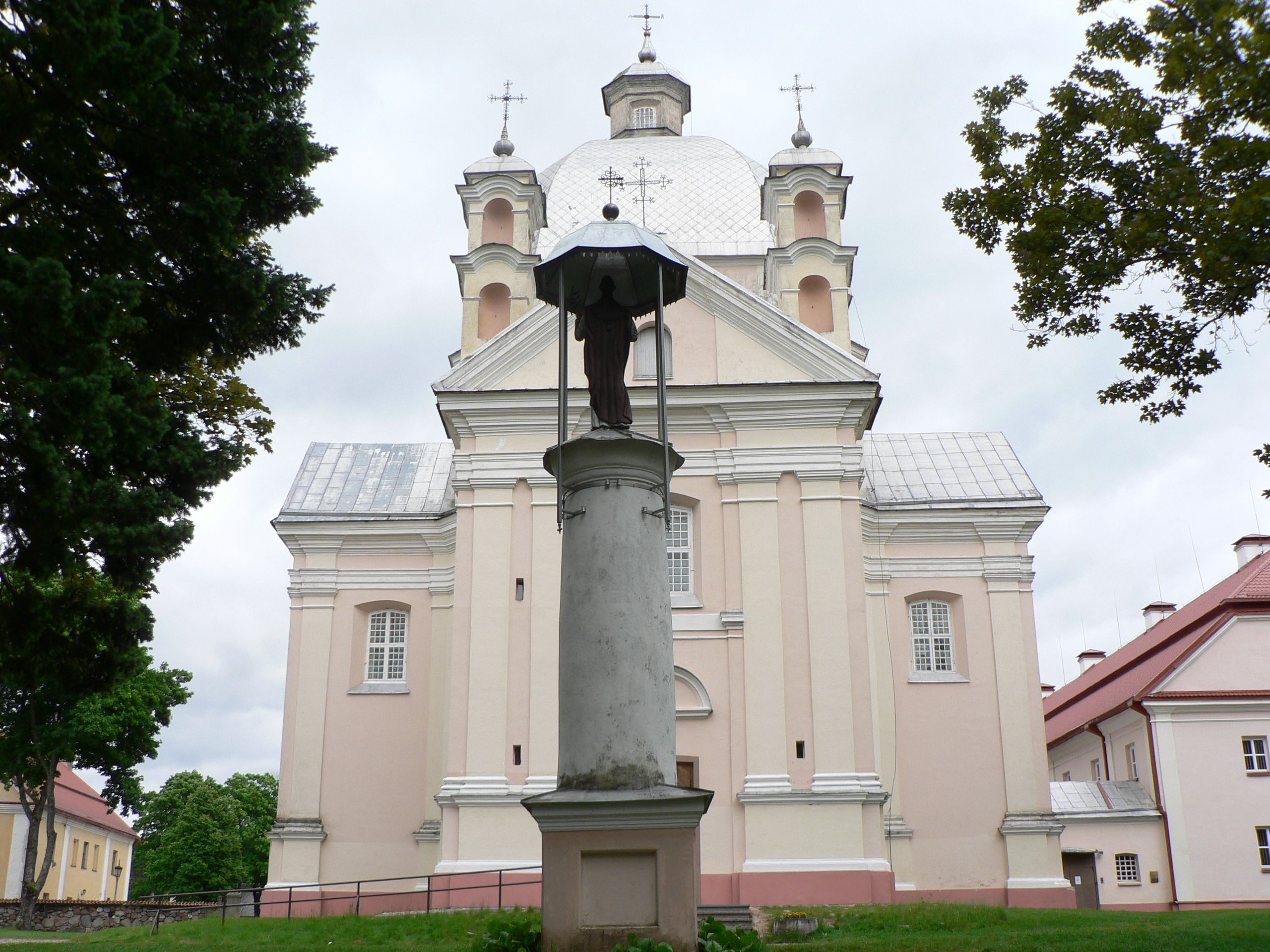
- Church of the Holy Trinity in Liškiava
- Interactive map of Liškiava
- Location within Lithuania
- Coordinates: 54°04′50″N 24°03′20″E
- Country: Lithuania
- Ethnographic region: Dzūkija
- County: Alytus County
- Municipality: Varėna district municipality
- Eldership: Merkinė eldership

Population (2005)
  - Total: 37
- Time zone: UTC+2 (EET)
  - Summer (DST): UTC+3 (EEST)
- Website: http://www.liskiava.lt

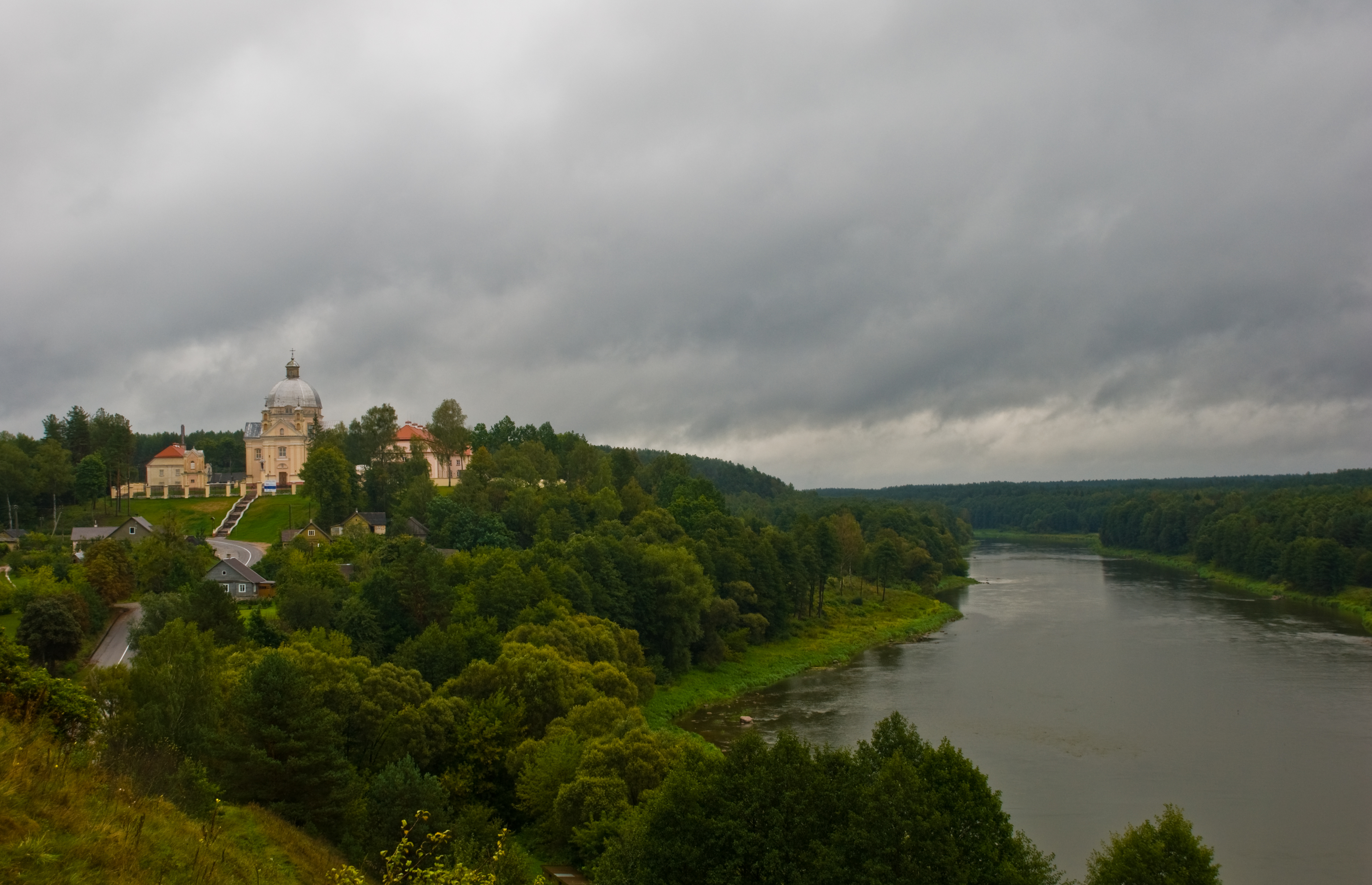
Nemunas and Liškiava seen from the hillfort

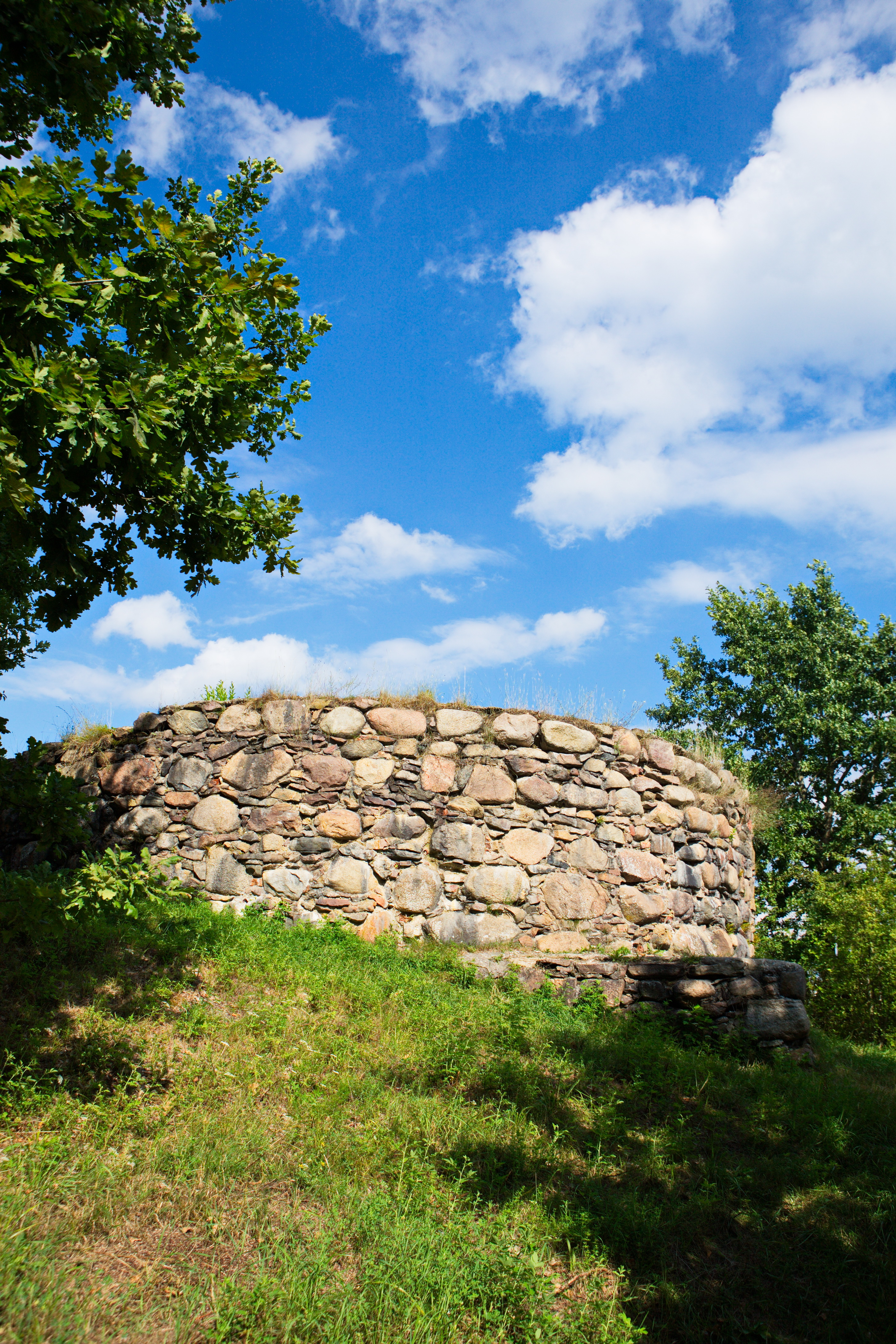
Liškiava Castle

Liškiava is a historic village in the Varėna district municipality, Lithuania. It is situated on the bank of Nemunas River, near the Lake Liškiavis. In 2005 its population was 37.

A leisure boat route connects Liškiava with the resort of Druskininkai, a few kilometres south along the river.

== History ==
At the end of the 14th century, Vytautas the Great ordered the construction of a stone castle on the hill. The building lost its importance after the Battle of Grunwald and was never completed; only the ruins of one tower remain today.

Since the second half of 16th century until 1624, Liškiava church belonged to Protestants. In 1677, a wooden church was rebuilt, and in 1697 the entire town was donated to the Dominican Order. In 1699–1741 a Dominican monastery and in 1704–1720 a brick Holy Trinity church were built in the town. After the partitions of the Polish–Lithuanian Commonwealth in 1795, it was forbidden to accept new monks into the monastery. In 1852, the monastery was reconstructed into living quarters and parsonage. After World War II, the building became a school. 1947–1977 it was a recreational base of the sartorial factory Lelija.

The Jewish population of Liškiava was 146 in 1923. The rabbi of Liškiava's Jews before World War II was Rabbi Avraham Tzvi Weinstein (later of London).
