= Margolin =

Margolin is a surname that, like its variants, (Note: Variants include Margaliot, Margalioth, Margalit, Margolies, Margolin, Margolioth, Margoliouth, Margolis, Margoliut, Margoliuth, Margolouth, Margolus, Margolyes, Margules, Margulies, Margulioth, and Margulis.) is derived from the Hebrew word מרגליות (margoliyot) whose meaning is "pearls",

Variants of the name are: Margolis, Margulis, Margules, Margolio(u)th, Margoliut(h), Margo, Margolinski, Marliss, etc.

Names like Perlman, Perelman, Perlstein, etc. have the same meaning.

The surname "Margolin" may refer to:

- Allison Margolin, American attorney
- Anna Margolin, pen name of Rosa Harning Lebensboym (1887–1952), American Yiddish language poet
- Arnold Margolin (1877–1956), American television producer, screenwriter, and director
- Bessie Margolin (1909–1996), American attorney
- Bob Margolin (born 1949), American guitarist
- Bruce Margolin (born 1941), American criminal defense attorney
- Carol Margolin, American artist known as Carol Heifetz Neiman
- Dansette (J. & A. Margolin Ltd)
- Deb Margolin, American performance artist and playwright
- Efraim Margolin, Israeli-American businessman and philanthropist
- Eliezer Margolin (1875–1944), Russian-Australian businessman and military officer
- Gayla Margolin, American psychologist
- Howie Margolin, member of The Demensions group
- Jamie Margolin, American climate activist
- Janet Margolin (1943–1993), American actress
- Jean-Louis Margolin (born 1952), French historian
- Jody Margolin Hahn (1900–1971), American television director
- Julius Margolin (1900–1971), Israeli writer and political activist
- Malcolm Margolin (1940–2025), American publisher, author
- Mike Margolin, American tennis player
- Phillip Margolin (born 1944), American writer and lawyer
- Quintin Corinne Margolin (1944–2003), American actress known as Quentin Dean
- Reuben Heyday Margolin, American artist and sculptor
- Stacy Margolin (born 1959), American tennis player
- Stuart Margolin (1940–2022), American actor
- Veniamin Margolin (1922–2009), Russian trumpeter
- Victor Margolin (1941–2019), American design historian
- Yaron Margolin (born 1954), Israeli dancer
