= Pearl Bernstein Max =

American university administrator

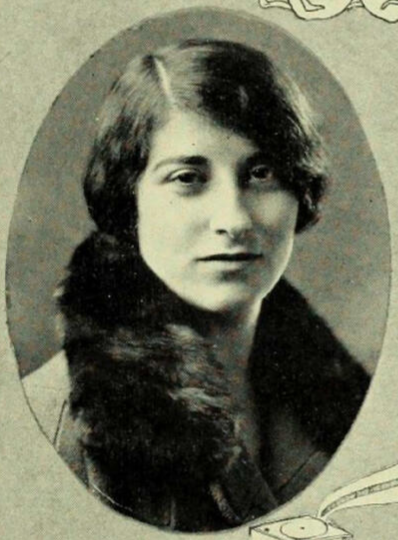
- Pearl Bernstein, from the 1925 yearbook of Barnard College
- Born: September 2, 1904; New York, New York, U.S.
- Died: February 4, 1999 (aged 94); New York, New York, U.S.
- Occupations: University administrator, city official, clubwoman, educator

Pearl Bernstein Max (September 2, 1904 – February 4, 1999) was an American educator and city official. As administrative director of New York City's Board of Higher Education from 1938 to 1969, she helped to plan the City University of New York, established in 1961.

== Early life and education ==
Max was born in New York City, the daughter of Julius A. Bernstein and Esther Simon Bernstein. Her father was a silk manufacturer. She graduated from Hunter College High School and Barnard College. She was president of the Menorah Society at Barnard.

== Career ==
Max was the first paid executive of the New York City League of Women Voters, and active in the Women's City Club of New York and the Citizens Budget Commission. In 1939 she spoke to the League of Women Voters at the New York World's Fair, on local bills modeled on the Hatch Act, to help curb corruption in municipal governments. In 1948, she wrote "Municipal Dollars and Sense", a study guide on municipal finance, for the League of Women Voters.

Max began working in city government in 1934, as the secretary of the Board of Estimate and Apportionment. In 1938 she was appointed by Fiorello La Guardia to be the first administrative director of New York City's Board of Higher Education, overseeing the work of four city colleges, with a total enrollment exceeding 50,000 in 1939. She worked for the organization of the City University of New York (CUNY), established in 1961. In 1967 she was founder and coordinator of the Office of Institutional Research at CUNY.

Max also taught courses on government at Barnard, and was an administrator for the New York City Employees Retirement System. In 1984 she gave an oral history interview for the American Jewish Committee Oral History Collection.

== Personal life ==
Bernstein married psychologist Louis William Max. They had a daughter, Claire Max Arons, who became an astrophysicist. Pearl Max died in 1999, at the age of 94, in New York City.
