= Perry Diamond Pearl =

American politician

Member of the Michigan House of Representatives from the Wayne County 5th district
- In office January 4, 1871 – December 31, 1872
- Preceded by: James Stewart
- Succeeded by: Henry Gordon

Personal details
- Born: c. 1824 New York, U.S.

Perry Diamond Pearl (born c. 1824) was an American politician in Michigan.

== Early life ==
Pearl was born around 1824 in New York.

== Career ==
Pearl was a farmer. On November 5, 1872, Pearl was elected to the Michigan House of Representatives where he represented the Wayne County 5th district from January 4, 1871 to December 31, 1872. During his time in the legislature, Pearl lived in Belleville, Michigan.

== Personal life ==
Pearl was married.
