= Isaac Margolis =

Personal life
- Born: 1842 Kalvarija, Russian Poland
- Died: 1 August 1887 (aged 44–45) New York City, United States
- Buried: Cypress Hills Cemetery
- Children: Max Margolis

Religious life
- Religion: Judaism
- Yahrtzeit: 11 Av 5647

Isaac ben Elijah Margolis (Hebrew: יצחק בן אליהו מרגליות, romanized: Yitsḥaḳ ben Eliyahu Margaliyot; 1842 – 1 August 1887) was a Russian-Polish rabbi and author.

== Biography ==
Isaac Margolis was born in Kalvariya, Russian Poland. He was the son of the rabbi of Wizhajny and a descendant of Yom-Tov Lipmann Heller. He received in his youth a traditional Talmudic education.

In 1862, he married the daughter of a prominent member of the Jewish community in Meretz, Vilna Governorate, and settled there. During this period, he developed an interest in the Haskalah, which drew criticism from religious zealots opposed to the movement. Combined with financial difficulties, these tensions eventually forced him to relocate. From there he moved to Kovno, where he found work as a private tutor in the household of Ezekiel Jaffe. He eventually assumed a rabbinic position in Druskeniki, in the Grodno Governorate.

In 1884, Margolis immigrated to the United States, where he became the rabbi of Congregation Anshe Kalvaria in New York City. There he became widely known as a public lecturer and educator.

He died suddenly of pneumonia on 1 August 1887. He was survived by his wife and five children, including Max Margolis. His funeral services drew a crowd of over 2,000 attendees. On the preceding Sunday, which coincided with Tisha B'Av, he had reportedly remarked to a friend, "Today is the anniversary of the fall of Jerusalem. I think I shall fall, too. I don't believe I will outlive the day."

== Work ==
Margolis was the author of Ma'oz ha-Talmud (Warsaw, 1869), a work defending the Talmud and the Shulḥan Arukh against contemporary criticism, and Ma'oz ha-Yam (Vilna, 1870), written in response to the critiques of Moshe Leib Lilienblum in the publication Megillah 'Afah. He also wrote Sippure Yeshurun (Berlin, 1877), a compilation of Talmudic and Midrashic stories and legends.

Margolis was a regular contributor to leading Hebrew-language periodicals of the time, including Ha-Maggid, Ha-Tzefirah, Ha-Melitz, and Ha-Shaḥar.

== Selected publications ==
- Ma'oz ha-Talmud (in Hebrew). Warsaw: Y. Goldman. 1869.
- Ma'oz ha-Yam (in Hebrew). Vilna: A. Y. & Sh. Y. Dworzetz. 1870.
- Sippure Yeshurun (in Hebrew). Berlin. 1877.
