= Margoliouth =

Margoliouth is a surname. Notable people by that name include:

- David Samuel Margoliouth (1858–1940), British orientalist.
- Moses Margoliouth (1820–1881), Jewish convert to Christianity.
- H. M. Margoliouth (1887–1959), British poet and literary scholar.
- Jessie Payne Margoliouth (1856–1933), Syriac scholar.

== See also ==
- Margolies, Margolin, Margoliouth, Margolis, Margolus, Margolyes, Margules, Margulies, Margulis, Pearl, Perl
