= Margulies =

Margulies (occasionally Margolies or Margolyes) is a surname that, like its variants shown below, is derived from the Ashkenazi Hebrew pronunciation of the Hebrew word מרגליות (Israeli Hebrew: [maʁɡaliˈjot]), meaning 'pearls'. Notable people with the surname include:

- Ben Margulies, American songwriter and record producer
- David Margulies (1937–2016), American actor
- Donald Margulies (born 1954), American playwright
- Jimmy Margulies (born 1951), American award-winning editorial cartoonist
- Joseph Margulies (artist) (1896–1984), Vienna-born American painter and printmaker
- Joseph Margulies (lawyer), American attorney and law professor
- Julianna Margulies (born 1966), American actress
- Lazar C. Margulies (1895–1982), physician and inventor of a type of Intrauterine device
- Leo Margulies (1900–1975), American editor and publisher
- Martin Margulies (born 1948), American musician/film producer better known as Johnny Legend
- Martin Margulies, real-estate developer and collector of contemporary art and photography
- Miriam Margolyes (born 1941), British-Australian actress
- Roni Margulies (1955–2023), Turkish poet and activist
- Samuel Hirsch Margulies (1858–1922), rabbi and Jewish scholar
- Susan Margulies, American engineer and professor

== See also ==
- Margolies, Margolin, Margoliouth, Margolis, Margolus, Margolyes, Margules, Margulies, Margulis, Pearl, Perl
