= Perel =

German disc jockey and music producer

- Born: Annegret Fiedler
- Origin: Saxony, Germany
- Occupation(s): Record producer, DJ
- Years active: 2012 -
- Labels: DFA, Kompakt, Armada
- Website: perelmusic.com

Annegret Fiedler, known professionally as Perel, is an electronic dance music disc jockey, vocalist, and record producer from Saxony, Germany.

== Career ==
Fiedler grew up in the Saxony, eastern Germany. Exposed to music as a child, she played in bands and began DJing electropop, until moving to Berlin in 2010. In 2012 she started working under the alias "Perel", both producing music and performing regularly in clubs. In 2018 she released her debut album, Hermetica, on the DFA record label, which was described by Mixmag as "somewhere between a more melodically inclined take on Sandwell District’s chiaroscuro techno and a darker interpretation of the sweetly melancholy, lightly theatrical synth-pop of Eurythmics".

The DFA label had troubles, and for her follow-up long player she signed to Kompakt. The album, irreverently titled Jesus Was an Alien, was released in 2022 and is partly inspired by religious hypocrisy. Perel also performs vocals on her productions. Her music has been described as "straddling the blurred lines between electronica, dance, and pop". Perel has been featured on BBC Radio 1 a number of times, including performing an Essential Mix and a guest Armada mix, both in 2025.

== Discography ==
=== Albums ===
- Hermetica (2018)
- Jesus Was an Alien (2022)
