= Margules =

Margules is a surname that, like its variants shown below, is derived from the Ashkenazi Hebrew pronunciation of the Hebrew word מרגליות (Israeli Hebrew [maɹgali'jot]), meaning 'pearls'. Notable people with the surname include:

- Ludwik Margules (1933–2006), Polish-born Mexican film director
- Max Margules (1856–1920), Austrian scholar
- De Hirsh Margules (1899–1965), Romanian-American painter

== See also ==
- Margolies, Margolin, Margoliouth, Margolis, Margolus, Margolyes, Margules, Margulies, Margulis, Pearl, Perl
