= Shosha Pearl =

Anonymous Orthodox Jewish writer

- Occupations: Author, blogger
- Writing career
- Pen name: Shosha Pearl
- Language: English
- Years active: 2012–present
- Genres: Jewish literature, romance, erotica
- Subjects: Judaism, sexual ethics, marriage

Shosha Pearl is the pseudonym of an anonymous Orthodox Jewish writer, known for her erotic fiction that is set in the Orthodox community and adheres to Orthodox halacha. She has self-published two books, the anthology I Will Watch You (2015) and a novella entitled Her Neighbor's Pleasure (2016), in addition to several short stories. She has also been published by the websites Hevria and Jewrotica.

== Background and style ==
Little is known about Pearl's real life due to her anonymity. She has revealed that she is married with children, that she did not have a "typical Orthodox upbringing", and that she has lived in Australia, Israel, the United Kingdom, and the United States.

She has cited as literary influences Anaïs Nin, Carol Queen's 5 Minute Erotica, Natasha Walker's The Secret Lives of Emma series, and the works of Lexi Maxxwell, as well as fellow Jewish erotica writers Jayde Blumenthal and Adam Arotti. Pearl writes Orthodox Jewish erotica that centers around Orthodox characters and adheres to Orthodox halakha (for example, only depicting sex between married couples and referencing trips to the mikveh); Pearl has said this is because she "wanted anyone, no matter how religious, to be able to read them and feel safe about the fact that they were getting turned on". She has maintained that, rather than fetishizing Orthodox Jews, her stories humanize them by depicting their universal desires and experiences.

== Writing ==
After dabbling in erotica for years, Pearl began writing frum Jewish erotica in 2012, seeing the popularity of Fifty Shades of Gray among her otherwise conservative Orthodox friends and sensing an untapped market. The following year, she published two short stories, "The Fringes of Memory" and "Before the Canopy", to the website Jewrotica. Pearl would also contribute to Jewrotica with a 2014 essay entitled "Sex in the Sukkah: Redefining the Mitzvah of Sleeping in the Sukkah" and a third short story, 2015's "Let's Bench". The same year as the latter, she self-published a short story collection entitled I Will Watch You: Four Short Tales of Jewish Love and Lust. This was followed by a novella in 2016, Her Neighbor's Pleasure, about a married woman whose accidental voyeurism and subsequent sexual awakening shapes her relationship with her husband.

In August 2019, Pearl announced via her website that she was in the process of publishing a four-part series of novels following a frum divorcee and her journey of sexual discovery, with the first novel being titled Touched, the second Mushky, the third Pilegesh, and the fourth as yet undisclosed. She subsequently posted to Hevria an excerpt from the first novel under the title "The Sins She Committed Before You". A new short story, "The Button", was published to Hevria in 2020.

== Bibliography ==
=== Books ===
- I Will Watch You: Four Short Tales of Jewish Love and Lust (2015)
- Her Neighbor's Pleasure (novella; 2016)
- Touched (TBD)
- Mushky (TBD)
- Pilegesh (TBD)

=== Short stories ===
- "The Fringes of Memory" (2013)
- "Before the Canopy" (2013)
- "Let's Bench" (2015)
- "The Button" (2020)

=== Essays ===
- "Sex in the Sukkah: Redefining the Mitzvah of Sleeping in the Sukkah" (2014)
