= Margolies =

Margolies (also Margulies or Margolyes) is a surname that, like its variants shown below, is derived from the Ashkenazi Hebrew pronunciation of the Hebrew word מרגליות (Israeli Hebrew: [maʁɡaliˈjot]), meaning 'pearls'. Notable people with the surname include:

- Marjorie Margolies-Mezvinsky (born 1942), American politician from Philadelphia.
- Moses S. Margolies (1851–1936), Russian-born American Orthodox rabbi.
- Rob Margolies (born 1983), American film director and screenwriter
- Reuvein Margolies (1889–1971), Israeli author and Talmudic scholar.

== See also ==
- Margolies, Margolin, Margoliouth, Margolis, Margolus, Margolyes, Margules, Margulies, Margulis, Pearl, Perl
