= Margulis =

Margulis is a surname that, like its variants, (Note: Variants include Margaliot, Margalioth, Margalit, Margolies, Margolin, Margolioth, Margoliouth, Margolis, Margoliut, Margoliuth, Margolouth, Margolus, Margolyes, Margules, Margulies, Margulioth, and Margulis, as well as Anglicizations like Margo and Marliss.) is derived from the Ashkenazi Hebrew pronunciation of the Hebrew word Margalit (מרגלית, Israeli Hebrew: [maʁɡaˈlit])), meaning 'pearl.' Notable people and characters with the name include:

- Berl Broder (born Margulis; 1817–1868), Broder singer
- Dan Margulis (born 1951), author, expert on color correction and image retouching
- David Margulis, Hero of the Soviet Union
- Evgeny Margulis (born 1955), Russian musician
- Grigory Margulis (born 1946), Russian mathematician, known for the Margulis lemma
- Lynn Margulis (1938–2011), American evolutionary biologist
- Margulis, a villain from the game series Xenosaga
