= Musée de l'Histoire de France =

Musée de l'Histoire de France (Museum of French History) may refer to:

- The Musée de l'Histoire de France (Versailles), created by Louis-Philippe I in 1837
- The Musée des Archives Nationales, also known as musée de l'Histoire de France between 1939 and 2006

== See also ==
- Musée des Monuments français (1795-1816)
- Musée des Souverains
