= Musée des Souverains =

French royal history museum

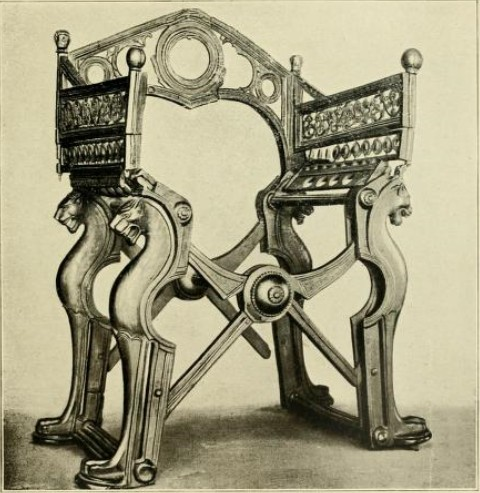
The Throne of Dagobert was a highlight of the Musée des Souverains

The Musée des Souverains (French pronunciation: [myze de suvʁɛ̃], Museum of Sovereigns) was a history-themed museum of objects associated with former French monarchs. It was created by the future Napoleon III as a separate section within the Louvre Palace, with the aim to glorify all previous sovereign rulers of France and to buttress his own legitimacy. The museum was formed from collections previously held in the National Library, the National Furniture Depository, the Artillery Museum, and the Louvre Museum itself, as well as gifts. After the fall of the Second Empire, the museum was closed and its collections mostly returned to their previous owners.

== History ==
The museum was created by decree of Louis-Napoleon Bonaparte on 15 February 1852, shortly after his successful coup d'état. The project was steered by Émilien de Nieuwerkerke, a staunch bonapartist who had become Director-General of the French museums administration in late 1849. Nieuwerkerke's cousin Horace de Viel-Castel became the museum's curator on 1 December 1852, the day before the establishment of the Second Empire.

Henry Barbet de Jouy replaced Viel-Castel as curator in 1863 and re-organized the exhibits in chronological order. The museum came to an end following the fall of the Second Empire on 4 September 1871, and was closed by decree on 8 May 1872.

== Location and collections ==
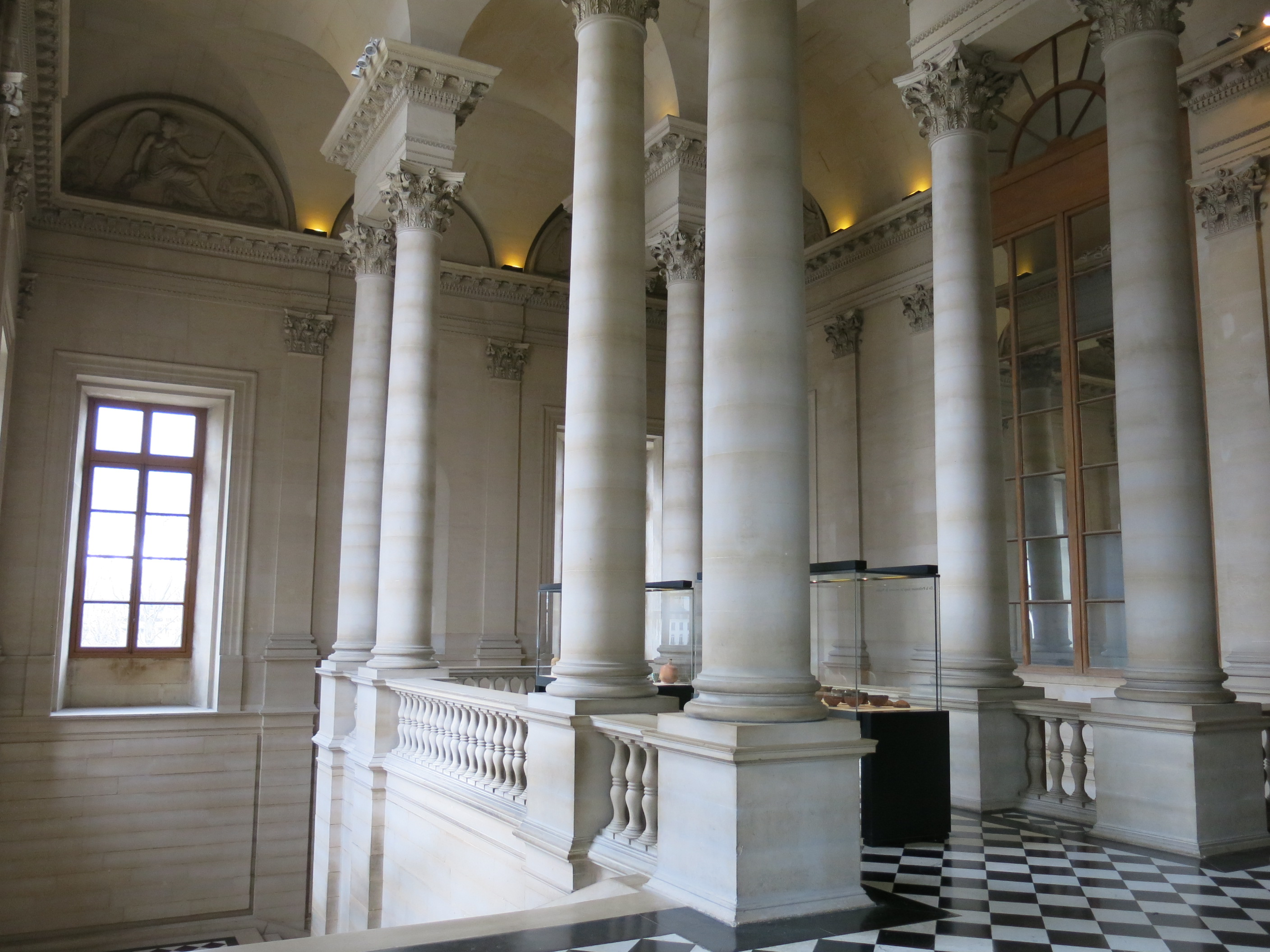
The Louvre's escalier du midi led to the entrance of the Musée des Souverains

The museum was located in five rooms of the Colonnade wing of the Louvre, on the first floor at the top of the wing's south staircase (escalier du midi), created under Napoleon by Pierre Fontaine to serve a projected suite of apartments and throne room that was never completed. The first three rooms had been decorated from 1828, under Charles X and the July Monarchy, with wood panelling and ceilings retrieved from historical buildings. The next two rooms were specifically designed for the museum in 1852 by Félix Duban and decorated with paintings by Alexandre-Dominique Denuelle.

- Vestibule, with decoration from Anne of Austria's room at the Château de Vincennes;
- Chambre à alcôve, with decoration from Louis XIV's bedchamber in the Louvre Palace's Pavillon du Roi (on the location of the later salle des Sept-Cheminées);
- Chambre de parade, with decoration from Henry II's ceremonial chamber, also originally in the Pavillon du Roi;
- Salle de la monarchie or salle des Bourbons, with decoration glorifying the House of France;
- Salon de l'Empereur, at the midpoint of the Colonnade, with decoration glorifying Napoleon.

The first three rooms have been preserved to this day in a similar state, whereas the decoration of the latter two was dismantled after 1870. All these rooms are now all part of the Department of Egyptian Antiquities of the Louvre.

The collections included numerous objects including the regalia of the kings and queens of France including most of those preserved from the treasury of Saint-Denis, the treasury of the Order of the Holy Spirit, paintings, sculptures, stained glass windows, furniture, suits of armor, the throne of Dagobert, the baptistère de Saint Louis, and memorabilia of Napoleon. They were all listed in a 1866 catalogue by Barbet de Jouy.

== See also ==
- Musée de l'Histoire de France (Versailles)
- Cabinet des Médailles
- BELvue Museum
