= Horace de Viel-Castel =

French art collector and museum director

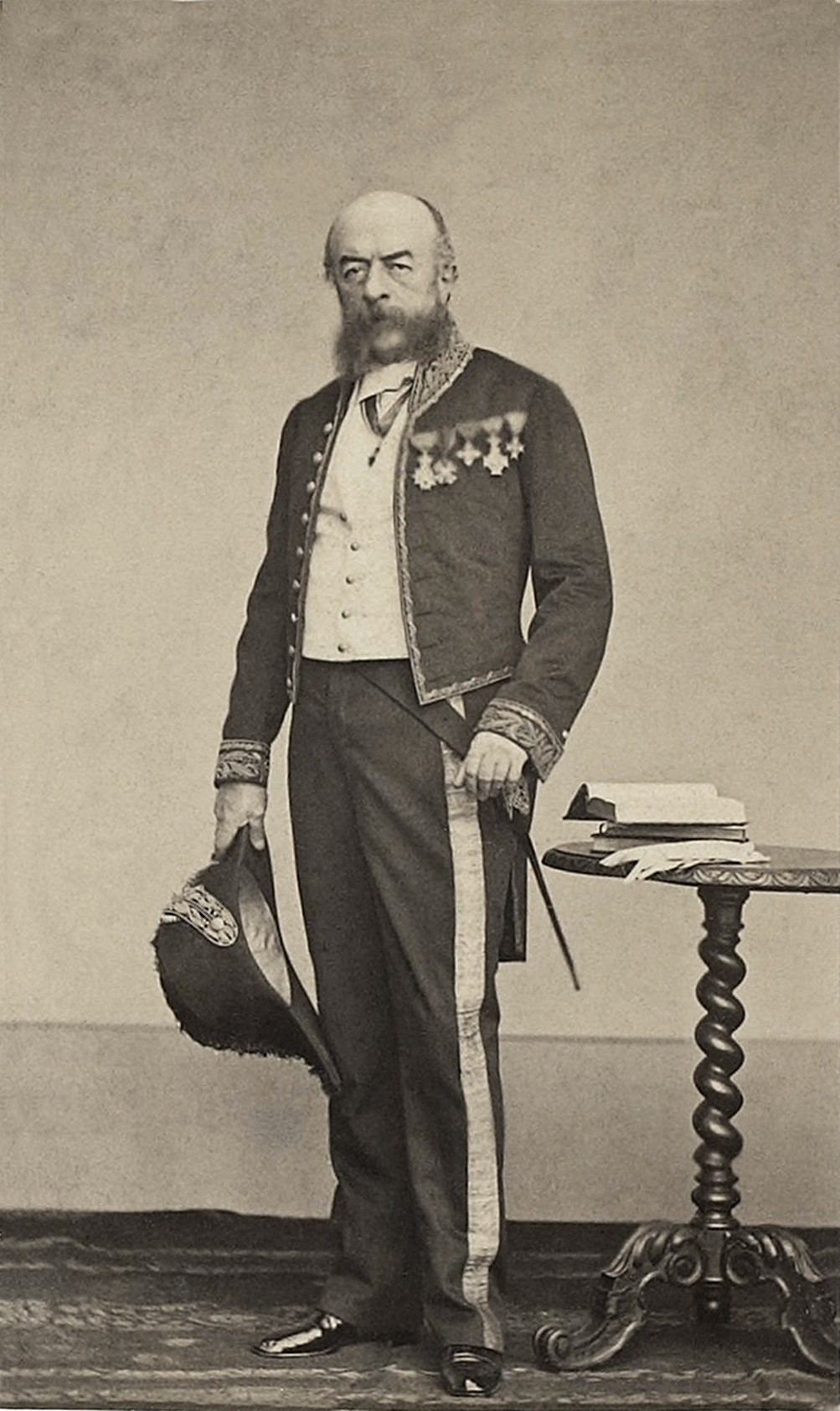
Horace de Viel-Castel in 1860

Marc-Roch-Horace de Salviac, comte de Viel-Castel, known as Horace de Viel-Castel (16 August 1802 Paris – 1 October 1864), was an art lover and collector, and director of the Louvre until 1863. A Bonapartist, he staunchly supported Napoleon III. He was an intimate of Princess Mathilde and of Alfred de Musset, the right arm of Nieuwerkerke until his disgrace on 12 March 1863. He was a great-nephew of Victor de Riqueti, marquis de Mirabeau.

== Family ==
Viel-Castel was born in Paris on 16 August 1802. He was a son of the former Caroline de Lasteyrie du Saillant (1780–1867) and Charles de Salviac de Viel-Castel (1766–1821), who was an Officer of the Dragoons and a Chamberlain of the Empress Joséphine in 1810. Among his siblings was Louis de Salviac de Viel-Castel, Baron de l'Empire, and Charles-Victor de Salviac de Viel-Castel. After his mother's death, his father remarried to Marguerite Sophie de Griffolet de Lentillac. From this marriage, he had a younger half-brother, Théodore Charles de Salviac de Viel-Castel.

His paternal grandparents were the former Anne Gabrielle Marguerite de Boucher and Charles-François Pons de Salviac de Viel-Castel, who fought in the Seven Years' War and distinguished himself at the Siege of Cassel). His paternal grandparents were Charles de Lasteyrie du Saillant, Marquis du Saillant, and the former Charlotte de Riquetti de Mirabeau (sister of Count Honoré Riqueti de Mirabeau and daughter of Victor de Riquetti, Marquis de Mirabeau and the former Marie Geneviève de Vassan, Baroness de Pierre-Buffière).

In 1826, Viel-Castel was married to his cousin Bonne de Lasteyrie du Saillant (d. 1862), a daughter of Jean de Lasteyrie du Saillant, Marquis du Saillant and the former Ghislaine de Berghes Saint-Winoch. Together, they were the parents of:

- Charles Edouard Honoré de Salviac de Viel-Castel (1838–1882), who married to Marie Anne Caffin de Mérouville (1850–1914).

His wife died in 1862 and Horace died two years later on 1 October 1864.

Through his son Charles, he was a grandfather of Count Pierre Joseph de Salviac de Viel Castel (1875–1950), who married American heiress Annah Dillon Ripley. Annah was a daughter of Sidney Dillon Ripley, niece of James Hazen Hyde, and granddaughter of Henry Baldwin Hyde (founder of Equitable Life Assurance), in 1910. They lived at 4 Avenue Marceau in Paris and at the Château de la Héruppe in Saint-Georges-Motel.

== Career ==
In the early days of the Second Empire, Viel-Castel was promoted by his cousin Émilien de Nieuwerkerke, a prominent bonapartist, and on 1 December 1852 he was appointed curator of the newly created Musée des Souverains inside the Louvre. He held that position until March 1863.

== Memoirs ==
His memoirs, which covered the time from 1851 until his death in 1864, testify to the society of the Second Empire. Although rich in detail on history, plans, and policy, it is his prickly and malicious style which granted the author a dark posterity after their publication twenty years after his death: he was a misanthrope, and a reactionary. His favorite targets were Leon de Laborde, Prince Napoleon and Victor Hugo. Also notable was his anglophobia.

== Quotations ==
- "France has never been republican because it is the kingdom of vanity"
- "The Emperor looks at the world as a chess-board on which he plays his part; it little matters to him whether his adversary is overpowered by a knight or a pawn, as long as he is conquered."

== Works ==
- Collection des costumes, armes et meubles pour servir à l'histoire de la France, depuis le commencement du Ve siècle jusqu'à nos jours, dédié au roi Charles X, 1827-1835 (Collection of the costumes, weapons and pieces of furniture to be used for French history, from the beginning of the fifth century until our days, dedicated to King Charles X)
- Des sentiments de justice et d'humanité de l'Angleterre dans la question indienne, published anonymously, 1857. (Of the feelings of justice and humanity of England in the Indian question)
- Marie-Antoinette et la Révolution française, 1859 (Marie-Antoinette and the French Revolution)
- Le Pape et Jérusalem, published anonymously, 1861 (The Pope and Jerusalem)
- Mémoires du comte Horace de Viel-Castel sur le règne de Napoléon III (1851-1864), 1883–1884, published posthumously, 1884 (Memoirs of Count Horace de Viel Castel: A Chronicle of the Principal Events, Political and Social, during the Reign of Napoleon III from 1851 to 1864)
