= Émilien de Nieuwerkerke =

French sculptor

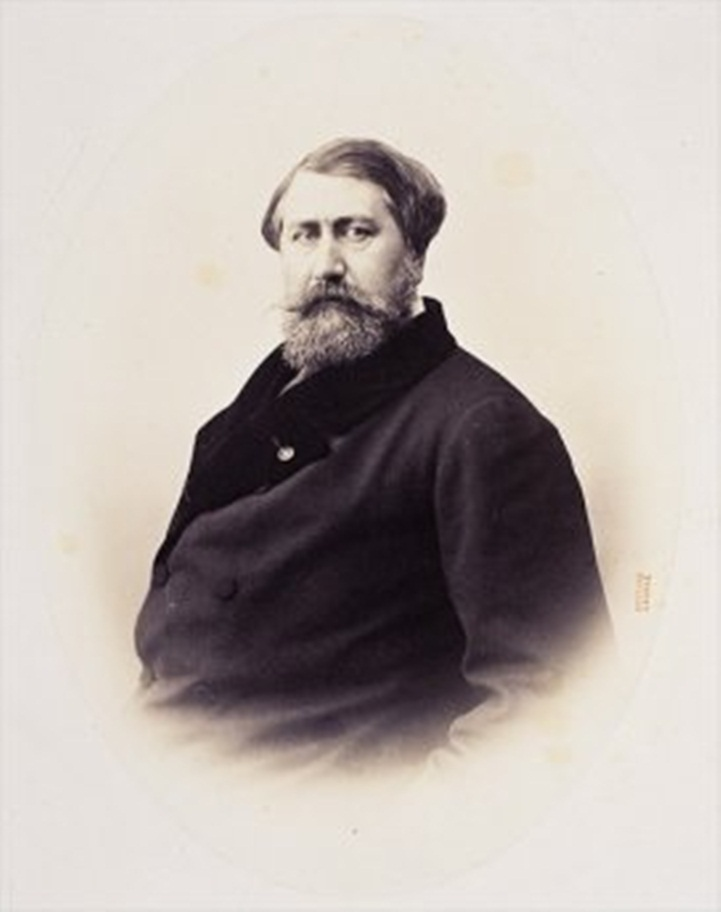
Émilien de Nieuwerkerke.

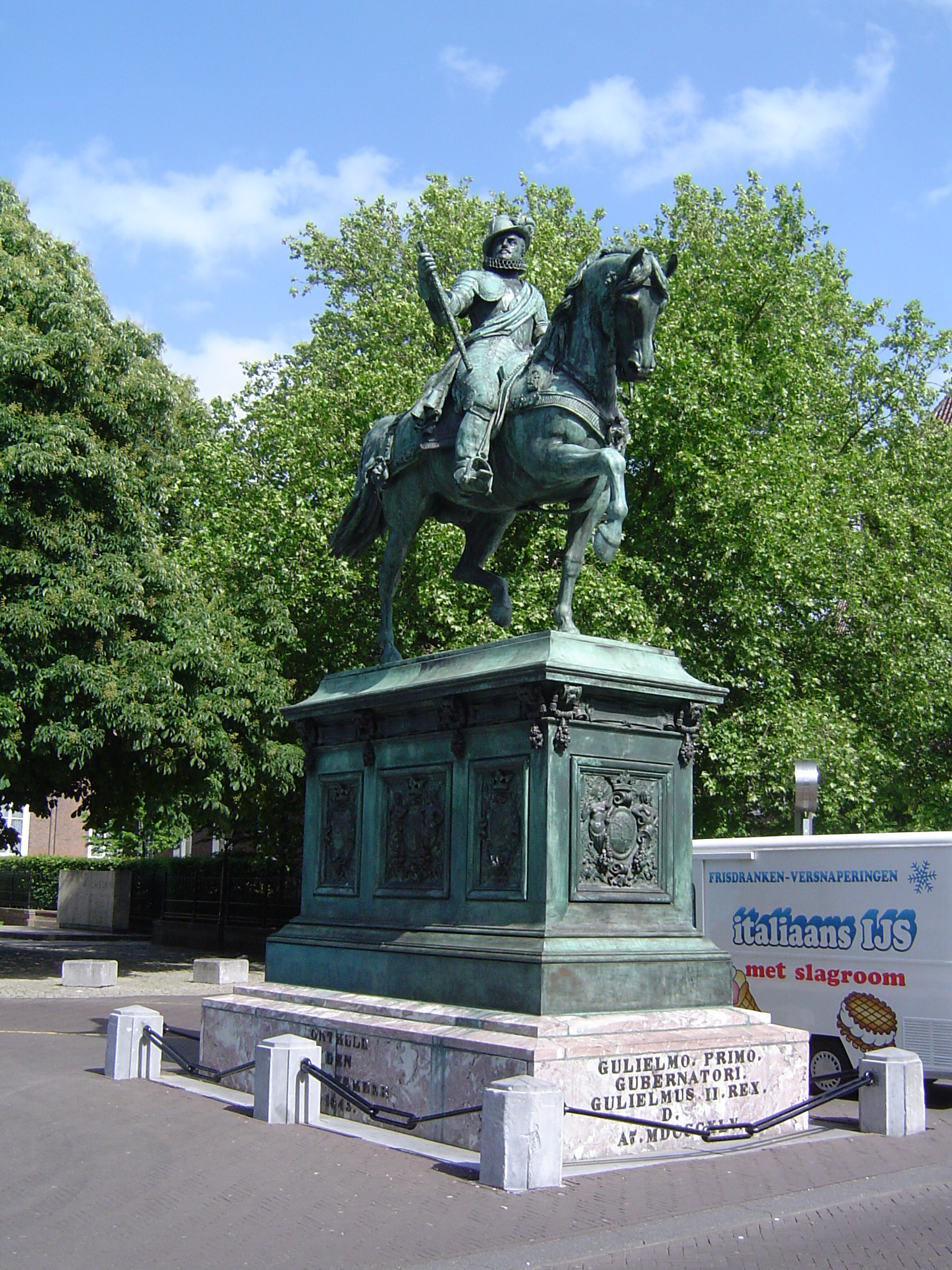
Nieuwerkerke: Equestrian statue of William I of Orange-Nassau in The Hague.

Count Alfred Émilien O'Hara van Nieuwerkerke (16 April 1811 in Paris – 16 January 1892 in Gattaiola, near Lucca) was a French sculptor of Dutch descent (his grandfather was the illegitimate son of a minor stadthouder) and a high-level civil servant in the Second French Empire. He is also notable as the lover of Princess Mathilde Bonaparte, after her estrangement from her husband Anatoly Nikolaievich Demidov, 1st Prince of San Donato.

== Early life and education ==
Émilien de Nieuwerkerke was the son of the Dutch Legitimist officer Charles de Nieuwerkerke (1785, Lyon – 1864, Paris), who returned to Paris with Louis XVIII in 1815 after the Hundred Days, and Louise-Albertine de Vassan (died 1854), from a noble family from the Soissonnais. After having become a page of Charles X in 1825, the year of his coronation in Reims, he then entered the école royale de cavalerie at Saumur in 1829. However, as a legitimist, he abandoned his career on Charles X's fall in July 1830 during the July Revolution of 1830.

== Marriage and separation ==
On 30 June 1832, aged 21, he married count Auguste de Monttessuy's daughter Thécla (1810–1884) at Auguste's château de Juvisy (the town's town hall since 1900 - Auguste had been the commune's mayor from 1823 to 1835). Thécla's brother Gustave was a diplomat and mayor of Juvisy and married Pauline de Württemberg, illegitimate daughter of Prince Paul - uncle of Mathilde Bonaparte - and of Lady Whittingham. However, the couple quickly separated on grounds of incompatibility of temperaments.

== Personality and early interest in sculpture ==
Vigorous, majestic and with a certain air to him, to which he joined physical presence, a great amenity, well-spokenness and the art of compliment - he thus became known as the "beautiful Batavian" ("beau Batave"). He was adored by women (one declared "He has the air of a resting lion"), as the Goncourts affirmed in their Journal of 10 November 1863 - "he at once resembles Charlemagne and a handsome chasseur behind the cars". In 1834, during a six-month stay in Italy, he discovered and became passionate about ancient sculptures. He also became fascinated by the work of the famous sculptor Félicie de Chauveau, whom he met in Florence, and thus decided to become a sculptor himself on returning to France. He thus took classes in the studios of Pradier and baron Carlo Marochetti and attempted a statuette of his cousin Horace de Viel-Castel, who became curator of the newly created Musée des Souverains at the Louvre in December 1852 and a chronicler of the imperial court. Sculpting also suited him due to the freedom that attached to it and meant that he did not have to find another.

== Early commissions and exhibitions ==
He took on official commissions and exhibited at the Paris Salon from 1842 with a marble bust of the comte Charles de Ganay. One of those commissions was a 4.65m high "Equestrian statue of Napoleon I", inaugurated on 20 September 1852 in the sculptor's presence by the Prince-President on 20 September 1852 on the largest square on the Perrache peninsula (now called place Carnot) in Lyon. This was destroyed between November 1870 and February 1871 and the only surviving copy of it is that inaugurated on 20 August 1854 at the centre of place Napoléon in La Roche-Sur-Yon (the former "Napoléon-Vendée"), main town and prefecture of this Napoleon-founded department. However, in 1860 the Susse foundry did cast copies in five different metals (one such copy is now at the château de Compiègne, and another was sold at Compiègne on 17 March 2001 for 30,000 francs [requires verification - no reference, and the franc was no longer in use in 2001, having been replaced by the Euro]). One of his best-known other works is "The battle of the duke of Clarence", bronze copies of which were cast by the Susse foundry from 1839 to 1875 - one copy entered the English royal collection at Osborne House in 1901, and another was sold at public auction at Chartres on 23 March 2003.

In 1845, during a trip into Italy with Henri de Bourbon, comte de Chambord, he visited the collection of the Russian millionaire Anatoly Nikolaievich Demidov, 1st Prince of San Donato and became the lover of Demidov's wife Princess Mathilde (niece of Napoleon). The following year she left Demidov and moved to lodgings found for her by Nieuwerkerke at an hôtel at 10 rue de Courcelles in Paris - their liaison lasted until August 1869. Following the elimination of the Republican civil servants, he was made director-general of museums on 25 December 1849 and installed in the Louvre the following day.

== Role in Second French Empire ==
A Colonel d'État-Major of the National Guard, he supported the coup d'état of 2 December 1851. Made a free member of the Académie des Beaux-Arts on 19 November 1853, on 5 July 1853, he became intendant des Beaux-Arts of the Emperor's Household and finally in 1870 surintendant of the Imperial Museums. Until the fall of the Second French Empire, he played a highly important rôle, acting as a kind of minister of cultural affairs. It was at his request that the painter William Wyld (of English birth but resident in Paris) was allowed to exhibit in the French section of the 1855 Exposition Universelle (the second after that in London in 1851). He was responsible for four museums (Louvre, Luxembourg, Versailles, then the Saint-Germain-en-Laye), for the objets d'art in the imperial palaces, for imperial commissions of paintings, sculptures and engravings and for the organisation of the Paris Salon. With difficulty, he also reformed the École des Beaux-Arts. He also became a senator and conseiller général for the Aisne. He was the subject of several attacks by artists and critics due to his taste veering more to old art and academicism than contemporary art - he refused to acquire works by some already-acclaimed artists such as Camille Corot who he did not appreciate.

== Fall of the imperial regime ==
In Paris he lived in a hôtel particulier in the Monceau quarter at 13 rue Murillo (8th arrondissement), where he lived and had his gallery and studio "that does not draw the eye". He had had it built by the imperial architect Lefuel on a parcel of land acquired from the Pereire brothers in May 1869 and completed a year later - three months before the fall of the imperial regime. That fall forced him to submit his resignation to Gambetta. Sick and fearing his arrest, he got on a train to Boulogne-sur-Mer alone in an attempt to flee to the United Kingdom. However, he was found unconscious in the train compartment and transported to Valéry-en-Caux (Somme), where he asked for safe conduct from princess Marie Cantacuzène (1821–1891), who he had met in 1862 at the house of princess Mathilde. Nieuwerkerke and his daughter Olga (1843–1929) then moved to London, where in October he tried to sell some of the smallest of his objets d'art to the South Kensington Museum. These came from Nieuwerkerke's extraordinary collection (for which no list or inventory survives) of more than 800 historic art objects, in metal and gold, sculptures, ceramics, painted enamel, glass and furniture. It also included Medieval and Renaissance arms and armour, including 100 swords, 60 daggers, 50 helmets, 15 sets of armour or demi-armour, and the only known complete example of Gothic armour for man and horse (now in the Wallace Collection).

== Sale of gallery, move to Italy ==
In April 1871 he sold his Paris hôtel to the American collector William Henry Riggs for 188,500 francs and at the end of July he gathered his collection in Paris for transport to London, where he sold it "at a costly price" (400,000 francs) to the wealthy English collector Sir Richard Wallace, a friend of the deposed French emperor and his wife - it is thus now in the Wallace Collection. In July 1879, on coming to assist at the funeral of the prince imperial (killed in June 1879 in Zululand) Nieuwerkerke visited Wallace. The money raised by selling his collections and hôtel allowed him to move into exile in Italy, where in May 1872 he acquired the 16th-century "villa Burlamacchi" at Gattaiola near Lucca. There he lived the last 20 years of his life with his friends the Cantacuzène princesses, even starting a smaller collection of Renaissance Italian works (though he quickly had to re-sell his acquisitions). He died aged 80 and was buried in the cemetery at Lucca where, at Olga's request, the funerary chapel was ornamented with a bust of him by the sculptor Barré. One of his obituaries was written by Philippe de Chennevières (1820–1899), his closest collaborator and director of the Beaux-Arts (resigning in 1878).

== Bibliography ==
- (in French) Paolo Rinaldi, "Intérieurs de Toscane", Taschen, 1998, pp. 241–49
- (in French) Suzanne Gaynor, « Comte de Nieuwerkerke: A prominent official of the Second Empire and his collection », Apollo, vol. CXXII, no. 283 (November 1985), pp. 372–79.
- (in French) Marie-Dominique de Teneuille and Sophie Laporte (ed.), Le comte de Nieuwerkerke. Art et pouvoir sous Napoléon III, Réunion des musées nationaux, Château de Compiègne, 2000.
