= Baptistère de Saint Louis =

Brass object of Islamic art

The Baptistère de Saint Louis
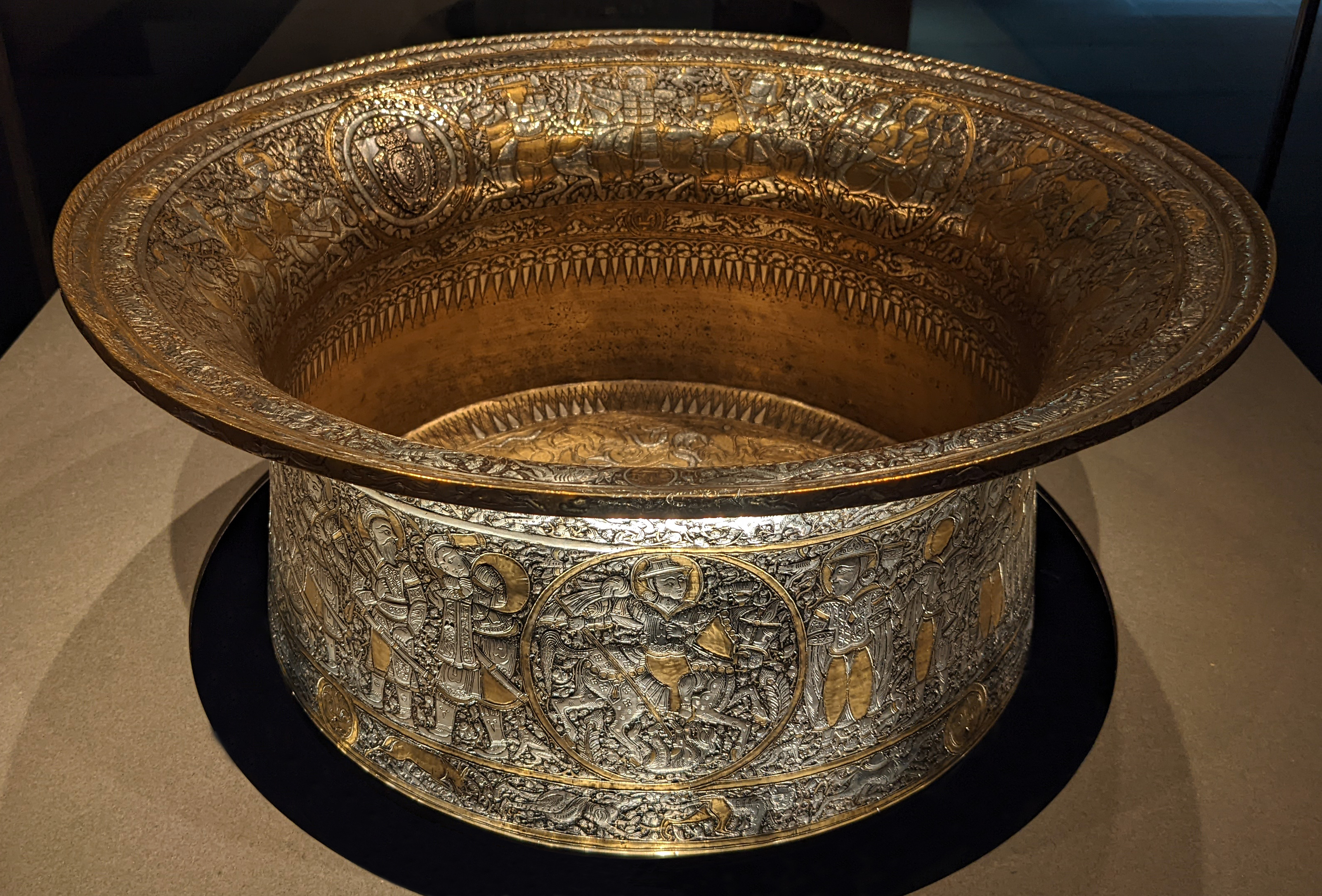
- Artist: Muhammad ibn al-Zayn
- Year: 1320–1340
- Medium: Hammering, engraving, inlay in brass, gold, and silver
- Dimensions: 50.2 cm x 22.2 cm
- Location: Louvre, Paris
- Accession: LP 16

The Baptistère de Saint Louis is an object of Islamic art, made of hammered brass, and inlaid with silver, gold, and niello. It was produced in the Syro-Egyptian zone, under the Mamluk dynasty by the coppersmith Muhammad ibn al-Zayn. This object is now in the Islamic Arts department of the Louvre under inventory number LP 16. Despite its common name, it has no connection with the King of France Louis IX, known as Saint Louis (1214–1270). It was used as a baptismal font for future French kings, making it an important Islamic and French historical object.

The origins and original purpose of the basin are not fully known, since the first record of the object was in a French church inventory. It was possibly used as a ritual washing bowl at the Mamluk court or it could have been commissioned by a Christian patron.

The Baptistère de Saint Louis has a complicated visual program on the interior and exterior, depicting a number of different groups of people, a wide variety of animals, fish, plants, and Arabic inscriptions. The basin was made through an engraving and hammering process using precious and high quality metal. Due to the ambiguous history of the basin, the meaning of the iconography, the exact date and location of its creation, and sponsorship is still being debated by scholars.

== History ==
The conditions of commissioning and production of the object are still unknown, as is the date and context of its arrival in France. It does not appear on the inventory of goods Charles V erected before 1380, but it is mentioned around 1440 in an unpublished inventory of the treasure of the Sainte-Chapelle de Vincennes. On September 14, 1606, it was used for the baptism of the future king Louis XIII.

The Baptistery can be traced several times to the 18th century: first in an inventory of the sacristy of the Sainte-Chapelle de Vincennes of 1739 and in the article "Vincennes" in Description of Paris by Jean-Aimar Piganiol of La Force, in 1742, in which he explains that the baptistery was located for some time at the Bâtme des Enfans de France and served at the baptism of Dauphin who later went on to reign as Louis XIII. He then goes on to describe the Persian or Chinese figures throughout the basin as well as the variety of animals represented throughout the inner frieze.

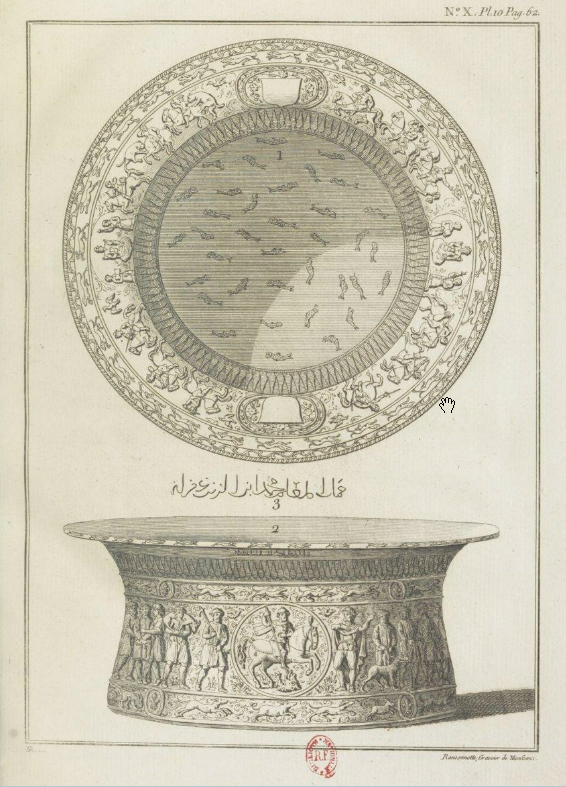
General view of the Baptistery of Saint Louis, engraving published in the National Antiquities of Aubin-Louis Milin, 1791

In 1791, Aubin-Louis Milin, in National Antiquities, seems to be the first to make the link between the Baptistery and Saint Louis

The same author recognizes many Western characters; he believes that the four horsemen present in the medallions outside indicate the years of conflict between the sultans and the Franks. Milin also raises the possibility of an earlier arrival in France, linked to the Embassy of Harun al-Rashid to Charlemagne at the beginning of the 10th century. The work also presents rather imprecise engravings, but which show that the object has not undergone major modification since that time, with the exception of the addition of two plates to the arms of France in 1821, a date in which the object is used to baptise the Duke of Bordeaux.

On 17 January 1793, the Baptistery was sent to the deposit of Petits-Augustins before entering the museum nine days later. Replaced in 1818 at Vincennes, by order of the king, it returned to the Louvre in 1852, after a decree of Louis Napoleon Bonaparte stating that "all objects that belonged to the rulers who ruled France would be sought, gathered and placed in the Palace of the Louvre." It left the museum temporarily in 1856 to serve in Notre Dame at the baptismal ceremony of Prince Napoleon Eugene; this is the last time this basin was used as a baptismal object.

The year 1866 is marked by two publications: in the Catalog of the Museum of Sovereigns Henry Barbet de Jouy describes the subjects of the basin and their depiction of a Saracen prince fighting, hunting, and feasting, as well as the different animals, some predators and some prey.

Barbet de Jouy calls into question the dating proposed before and puts forward the hypothesis of a work reported in France around 1150. For its part, Adrien Prévost de Longpérier proposes in an article the first scientific study of the Baptistery. He discovered the origin of the false date of Piganiol, refutes the idea that the work served at the baptism of St. Louis, and sees a work of the first half of the 13th century, because of fleur-de-lys which seem to have been added in the 13th or 14th century in Europe.

In 1930, a stylistic analysis by Mehmet Aga Oglu is the first to recognize the baptistry as a work of Syrian workshop, and the date of the first quarter of the 14th century. Nine years later, at the time of the German invasion, the basin was made safe in the Chambord castle by conservationists John David-Weill and David Storm Rice, who was then in Paris to study. World War II delayed the release of his monograph, which remains today the most comprehensive and best illustrative reference. His interpretations have, however, been partly questioned by several researchers since then.

== Description ==
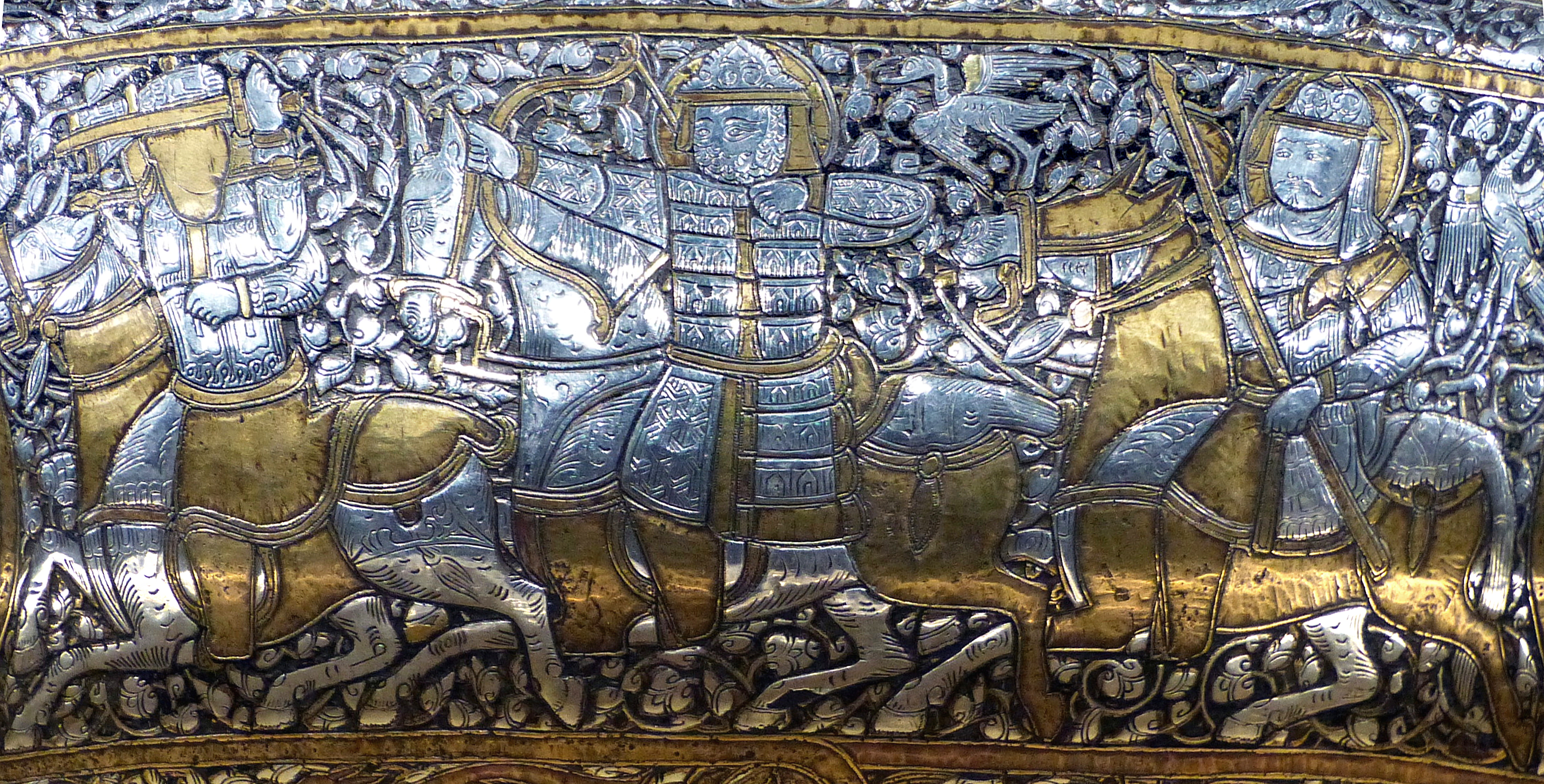
Battle scene (Band I3)

The Baptistery of St. Louis is a large basin with streamlined profile, made of a single sheet of brass. According to publications, its dimensions vary slightly:

- its height is between 22 cm; and 24.4 cm
- its maximum diameter varies between 50.2 cm; and 50.4 cm
- D.S. Rice also gives an indication of the minimum diameter: 38.4 cm.

It has decoration depicting human figures both internally and externally, which is characterized by a great diversity of characters, in their clothing, their physical appearance and their postures. According to D.S. Rice, this decoration would be oriented along an axis passing through the silver under the rim of the basin and a characteristic armor. All the figurative motifs are located on a background of plant foliage, where various animals are located. Outside, the decoration occupies the lower part of the basin; it consists of a main register with friezes of characters interrupted by four medallions, bordered by two friezes of running animals, interrupted by four medallions bearing a fleur-de-lys heraldry. Above the upper register, a vegetal pattern ends with lancets. A large inscription in silver takes place on the area remained untouched. A running animal frieze is also present on the edge of the rim.

Inside, the decor unfolds in the upper part in the form of a large register decorated with horsemen, interrupted by four medallions: two with a throne scene, two with arms. On either side of this main register unfurl animal friezes interrupted by fleur-de-lys medallions. On the rim, there is also a frieze marked by a wavy pattern, where stylized birds appear. At the bottom of this decoration, a vegetal pattern ends with lancets. The bottom of the basin is also decorated, on the periphery, with a frieze of lancets, and inside a multitude of aquatic animals.

Organization of the main friezes of the Baptistery.

=== The outer frieze ===
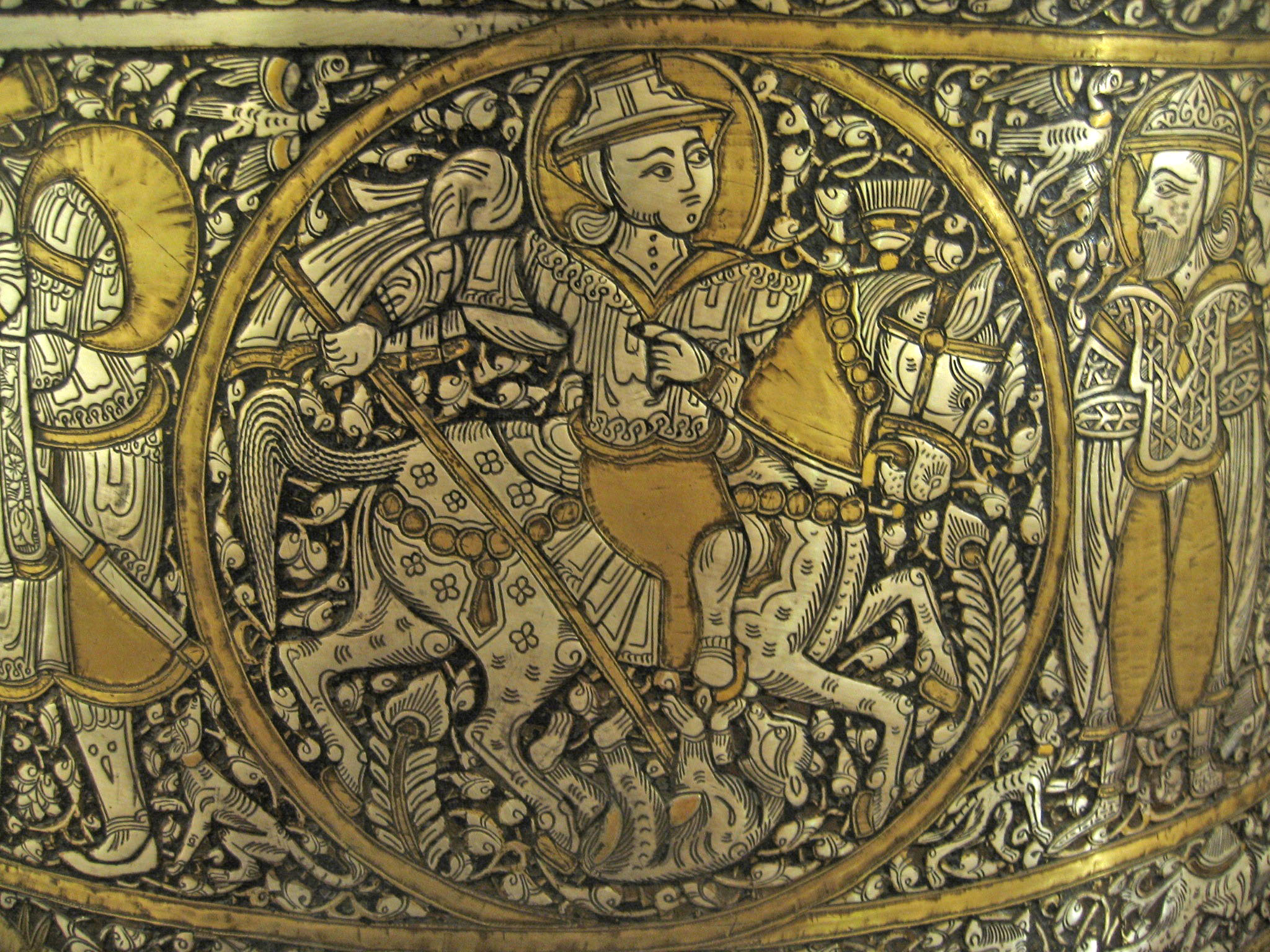
A rider in medallion A

The outer frieze includes twenty characters on foot, and four horsemen in the medallions. All are haloed.

The riders all are in action, wearing a costume and have a different physical appearance. On the other hand, their horses are all harnessed in the same way: a net, a saddle with stirrups, a cover more or less long on the rump, a martingale and ornate buttocks. A scarf with a tassel is tied on the nape of the neck. Their tail is sometimes tied (medallion B and D) and sometimes left free.

- Medallion A: The rider is a hunter who kills a bear with a spear. He wears a chinstrap hat, a long-sleeved and tight coat. A scarf or cape flies behind him. His face is elongated, smooth, with a protruding chin marked by a point.
- Medallion B: The rider is turbaned and wears a short-sleeved coat and a polo cane. The face is missing. A bird with a pointed beak and a long neck forming a loop – perhaps a stork – takes place on his back.
- Medallion C: the rider is a hunter, who thrusts his spear into the open mouth of a serpentine dragon with a knotted body. The man wears a hat, a short-sleeved coat and a cape closed on the chest and fluttering on his back. His elongated face is bearded.
- Medallion D: the rider seems to wear a headdress tied behind his skull and surmounted by a pompom. His features are reminiscent of the conventions of Iranian representations: a very round face, a mustache and a goatee. His garment, decorated with geometric patterns, is largely missing, but had to be a long-sleeved coat. His saddle is decorated with a bird. The man is an archer: he carries a quiver filled with four arrows and has just unhooked a fifth in the shoulder of a lion.

The characters on foot, in the same way, are distinguished by the diversity of their postures, their clothing, and their accessories.

- Band E1: Five characters, wearing a cloak attached to the chest, hair tied in a bun and a tripartite jugular hat, except for the central figure, who seems bareheaded. All bear beards, some long and some short. Two have arms crossed in the back, one at the left end, seems attached to a stake which we see the base in the ground, between his feet. The second from the left holds an inscribed cup and a long neck bottle. The central figure carries a quadruped in his arms. The character on the far right holds a written cup; his hat is adorned with a feather.
- Band E2: Six characters, three turned to the left, three to the right, the central figure looks to the left. Among the characters turned to the right, one is smaller than the others. He carries a polo cane, wears a coat and boots, and seems pushed by a man leaning behind him. The five tall figures are turbaned, hair falling freely and ears free; they wear a sword at the waist, as well as boots sometimes marked by symbols: a dot, two dots and a drop, two dots around a vertical line, and three vertical lines. Their round faces, marked by a mustache and a goatee, sometimes by a monobrow and picking on the cheeks, could be Mongolian. Two carry an ax to the half-moon blade, another a bow on the shoulders.
- Band E3: Four characters, dressed in a similar way to those of the band E1: a cape closed on the chest, a tripartite hat (whose end is flattened, unlike those of the band E1), and low shoes. Three appear to have a stubble; the fourth has a long beard. The third character from the left is wearing a different cap that Rice interpreted as being having bird feathers. The leftmost figure has his arms behind his back, the second holds a cheetah's leash, the third wears a hawk on his gloved hand. The rightmost character holds a crane in his right hand and a dog in his left hand; his hat is adorned with a feather, and he seems to raise his head to observe a duck.
- Band E4: Like those in the E2 headband, the five characters in the E4 headband wear long coats, boots marked with symbols (a shield with a round emblem, two dots, two dots and a drop) and swords. However, their hairstyles are different: three have headbands tied behind the head, another, a kind of turban, the last a hat similar to those of the band E3. All have knotted hair and are heading to the left. On the right, one wears a napkin decorated with five-petalled flowers and peonies on the left arm, and holds with the other hand a large bag he carries on his back; he wears the mustache and a goatee, a dot on the cheek, and a hat with three feathers. In front of him, a man with a long beard turns his head; he's holding a club. In front, another, whose beard is shorter, carries a bow and arrows. At the left end, two characters carrying a goatee, a mustache and a monobrow, are arranged one next to the other; one, standing, holding a sword, and marked with an indecipherable inscription. He presses his hand on the back of the other, who kneels while seeming to put his elbow on the ground. Unlike other characters, the one who kneels does not wear boots. The cannon of faces is thinner than that of the characters of the band E2.

=== The inner frieze ===
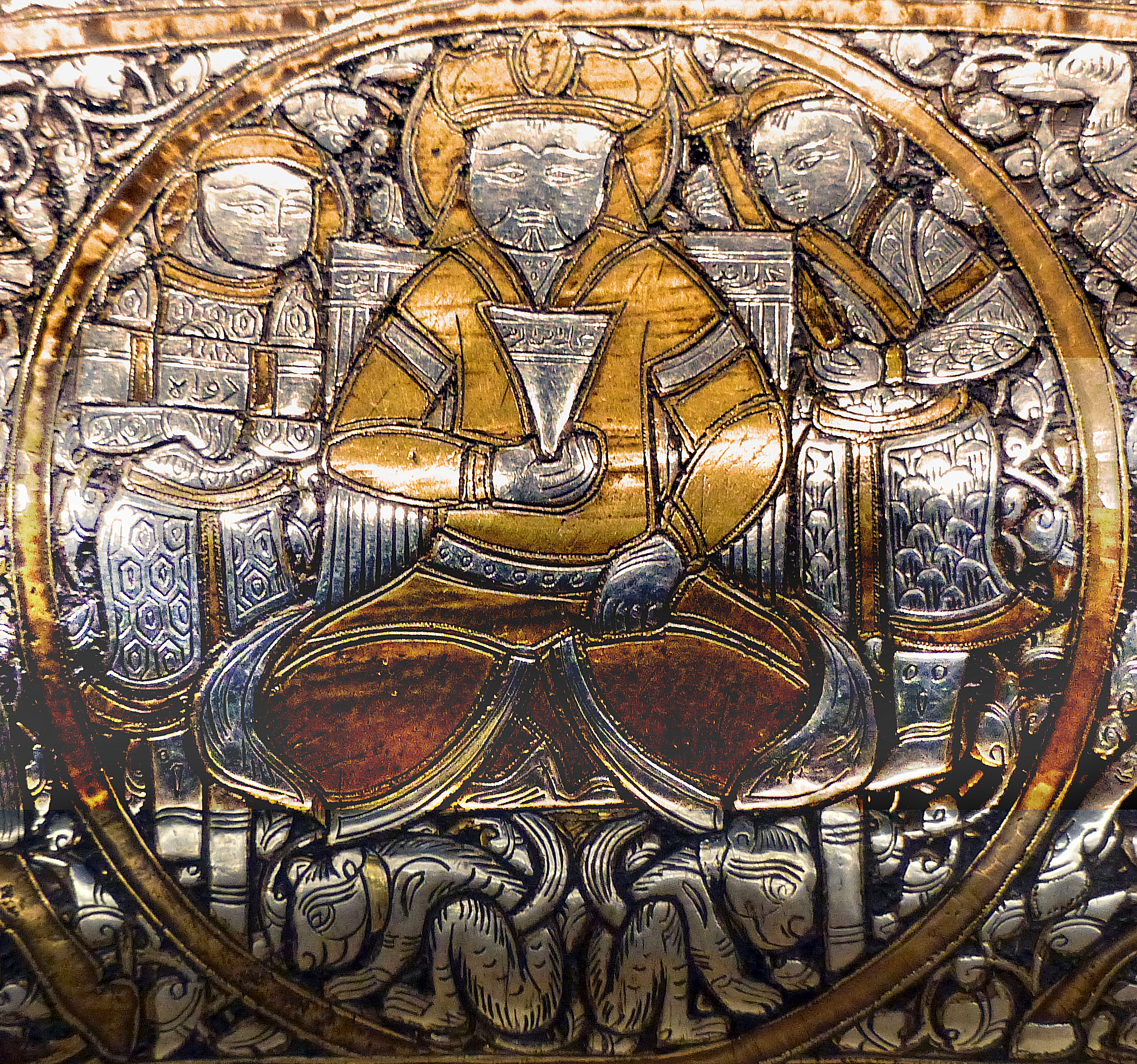
Medallion IV: enthroned ruler and attendants in the Baptistère de Saint Louis (1320–1340)

The medallions of the inner frieze work in pairs. Medallions I and III each have in their center a shield left blank until 1821, and then covered with a coat of arms and surrounded by plant motifs where five five-petalled flowers inlaid with gold can be seen. A frieze of plant motif encircles the whole. Medallions II and IV present a similar throne scene: a person, wearing a tripartite crown and an inscribed cup, sits at the eastern on a striped throne, inscribed on the upper part and supported by two lions with gold necklace; on either side of the throne stands a standing man who holds, for the one on the left, a written writing-board, and for the one on the right, a sword. These standing figures are dressed in a long mantle, and probably received a headdress in the form of a band, disappeared; on their boots are symbols: two dots and a drop. One of them (medallion II, on the left, bears a mustache, a goatee and dots on the face); the others are hairless. The face of one of the sovereigns (Medallion II) has disappeared; the other (medallion IV) also has a mustache and goatee, as well as a monobrow.

Between the medallions, four sets of three riders take place: two hunting scenes (I1, I4) and two war scenes (I2, I3). In all cases, the harness of the horses takes again that of the horsemen of the external medallions.

- On band I1, the two side hunters are turbaned, while the center one wears a headband. The first, whose boots are decorated with two dots and a drop, kills a feline with his spear while above him, a hawk attacks a duck. The one in the center strikes a bear with his sword above him. The last, whose saddle is adorned with a bird, makes a hawk rest on his gloved hand.
- The band I2 shows three warriors, the two on the left wearing the turban, and the one on the right wearing a hat. The central figure, who, on his boots, carries a vertical line and two points, seems to be attacked by the two others. He shoots an arrow at the left-wing figure, who attacks him with a spear, but is struck by the sword of the character on the right, with two-pointed boots and a drop, which also holds a stick in his other hand. On the ground, cut limbs (an arm, a hand, a head with a pompom hat) testify to the violence of the scene.
- In the center of the band I3 a figure entirely covered with a slat armor, the head protected by a shield that only lets see his eyes and topped with a hat, shoots an arrow at a character in front of him, the sword raised wearing a simple coat, a headband surrounding his head. At the back, a third rider seems neutral: he also wears a hat, holds a spear in his left hand and brings his right hand to his chest.
- The band I4 shows a lion hunt by three turbaned riders. On the left, the hunter draws his bow in the direction of a lion who bites the chest of his horse; that of the center attacks with the sword the animal which springs before his horse, forced to turn his head; in the rear, the last brandishes a sickle-shaped weapon against the lion perched on the rump of his steed.
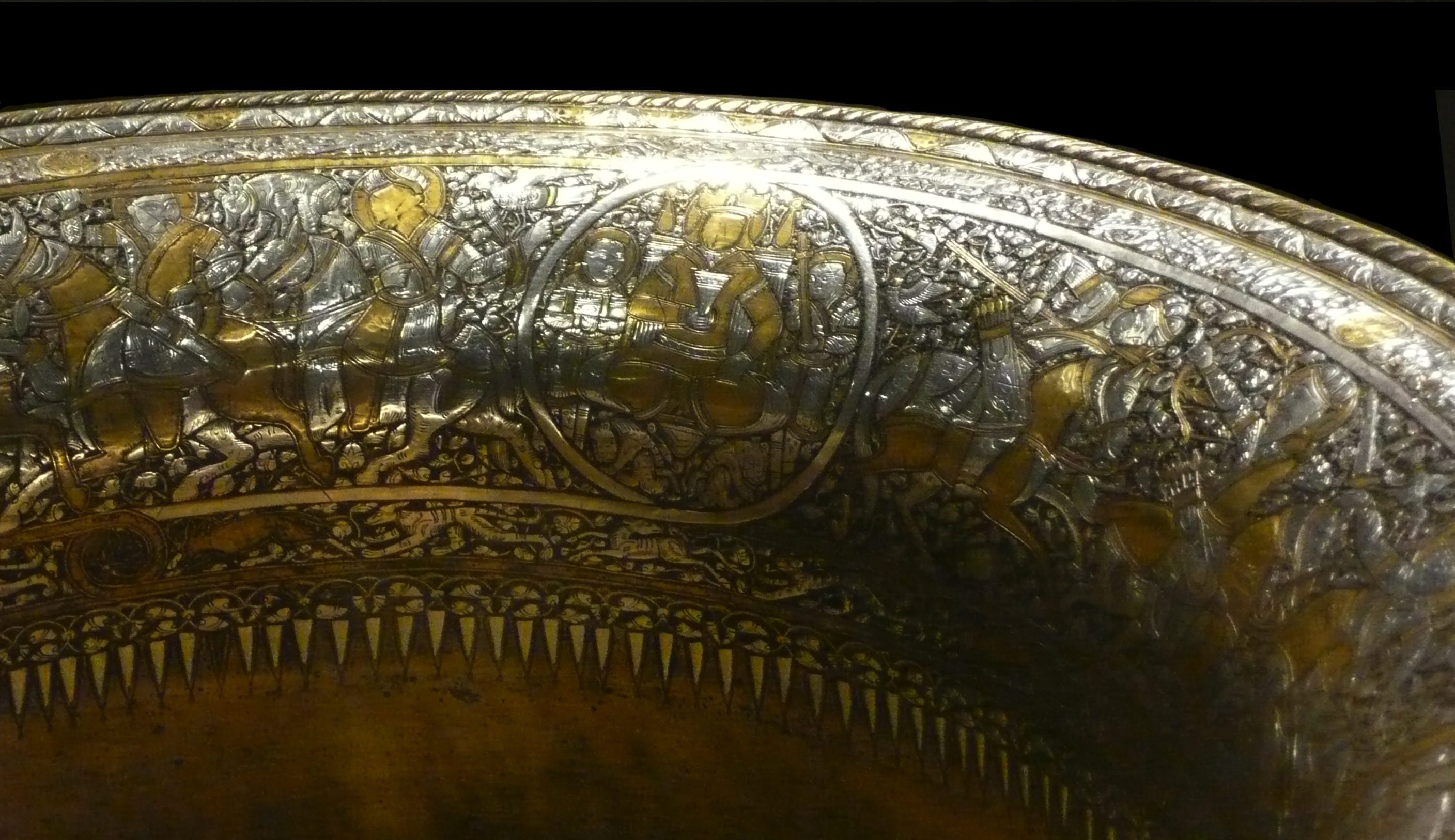
  From right to left, band I1, medallion II and band I2
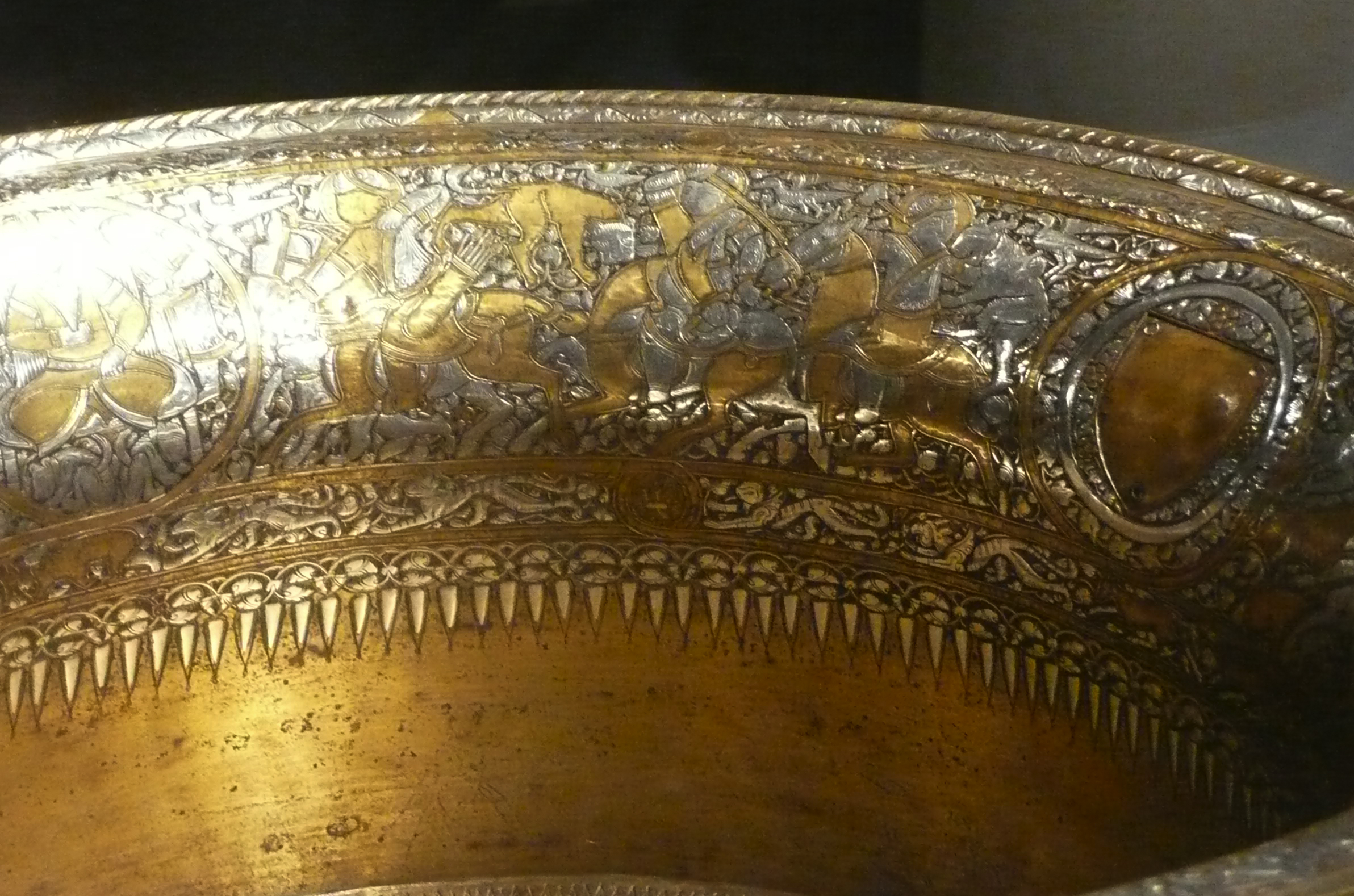
  From right to left, medallion III and band I4
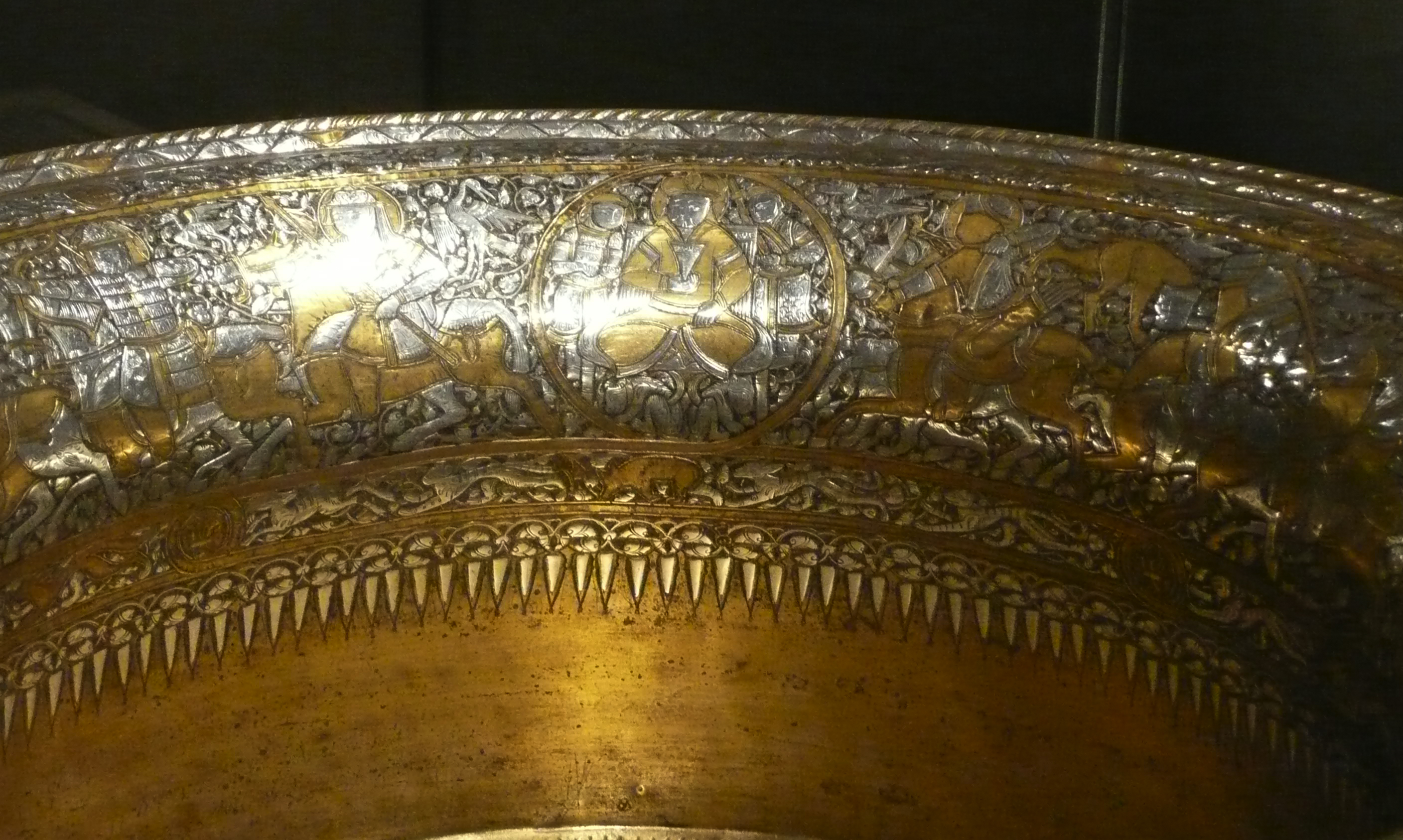
  From right to left, I4 frieze, IV medallion and I3 band
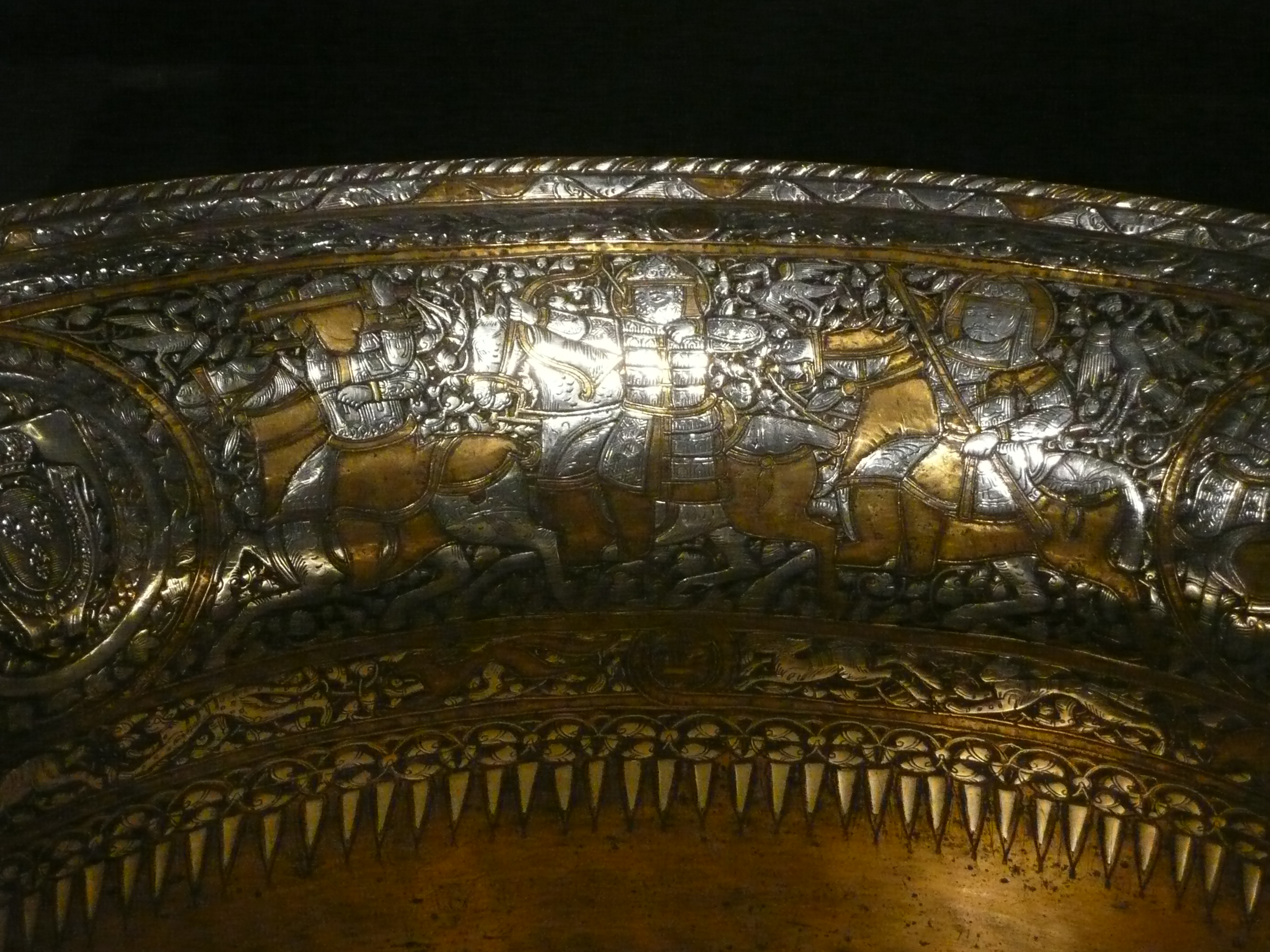
  Band I3

=== Inscriptions ===
- Several inscriptions are present on this basin. One Arabic inscription is positioned underneath the basin's rim and is adorned in silver. The other inscriptions are more concealed within the ornament, engraved on various objects. All of the inscriptions are engraved as cursive calligraphy (naskhi).
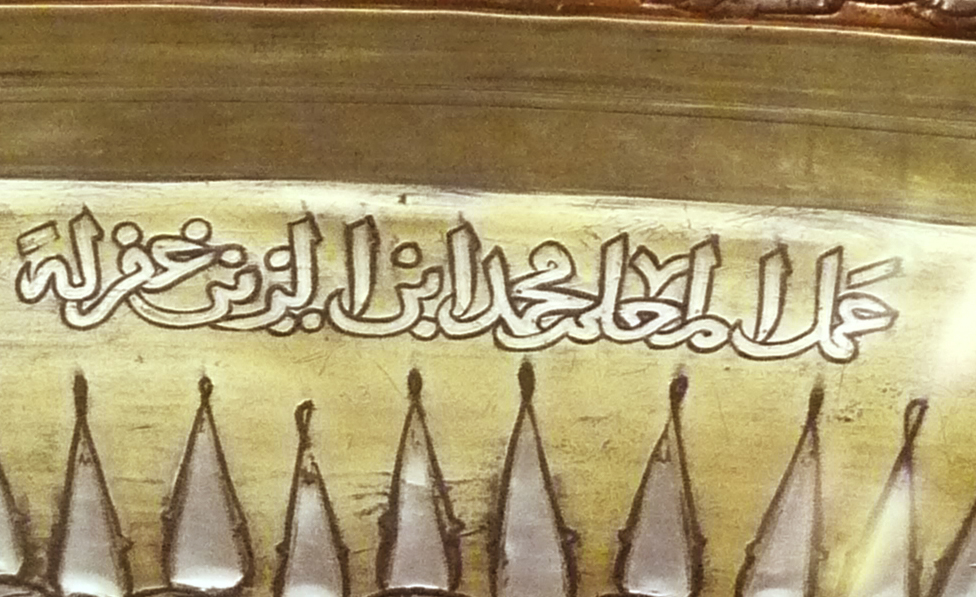
  Principal signature of Muhammad ibn al-Zayn

| Location | Reading in Arabic | Transcription | Translation |
|---|---|---|---|
| In silver letters under the lip, above the medallion A | عمل المعلم محمد ابن الزىن غفر له | 'Amal al-mu'allim Muhammad ibn al-zain ghufira lahu | The work of the teacher Muhammad Ibn al-Zayn who forgave him |
| Engraved on thrones and goblets in internal medallions II and IV Engraved on the cup carried by the character in the band E1 | عمل ابن الزىن | 'amal ibn al-zain | The work of Ibn al-Zayn |
| On the flat held by a character of the band E1 | انا مخفيى لحمل الطعام | Ana makhfiyya li-haml al-ta'am | I'm the dish to carry food |
| On the writing band worn by the character to the left of the medallion IV | دواه | dawâh | Writing Case |
| On the writing band worn by the character to the left of the medallion II | دوه | daw[â]h | Misspelled writing case |

=== Coats of Arms ===
- The Baptistery of Saint Louis has sixteen medallions bearing emblems in the interior and exterior animal friezes. These blazons were modified at an unknown date and replaced a fleur de lis, which could make one think that it was a French rectification; however, D.S. Rice believes that this is an Oriental-style fleur de lis, used both in the Ayyubid dynasty and in the Qalâ'ûn house. He also identified the two pieces of furniture originally found on the coats of arms: a lion crawling to the right (present on half of the outer faces) and an element consisting of a circle surmounted by a stem with two rectangles. D. S. Rice speaks of a tamga, that is to say, an identity symbol used since ancient times by the Turk-Mongols. Rice picks up there an identification of L.A. Mayer, but the form knows no equivalent and its owner could not be identified; E. Knauer proposes to see a tamga specially created for Berke, son of Baybars, but without bringing any element allowed to go beyond the stage of the hypothesis. Sophie Makariou prefers to see a key, which links to a coat of arms to a four-keyed cross on the lintel of the monastery of Nicolas-des-Chats in Akrotiri (Cyprus). The lion also poses a problem by its form, since it is never represented as stalking, but always passing, in Islamic heraldry. This challenged his identification as the emblem of the sovereign Baybars; S. Makariou interprets this as the coat of arms of the Lusignan family.
- Other heraldic elements are present on the object: besides the two scutiformes elements, left virgins until 1821, the boots of the dignitaries carry emblems that could be identified. In the coat of arms there is a fess worn by the characters of the E1 banner Emir Salar's emblem, of whom Rice wanted to acknowledge. However, this attribution is opposed. Other items on the boots have not been identified. It may be wondered whether this is heraldry, or simply insignificant clothing details. The vertical line that is present on some boots, which is also represented on furusiyya manuals, would be a stitch as opposed to an element of blazon.

=== Flora and fauna ===
- Animal motifs are widely present in the Baptistery of St. Louis and take several forms.
- Animal elements which are present in the narrative scenes, whether or not they participate in the narrative, consist of a complex composition at the bottom of the pond, with fish and other aquatic animals.
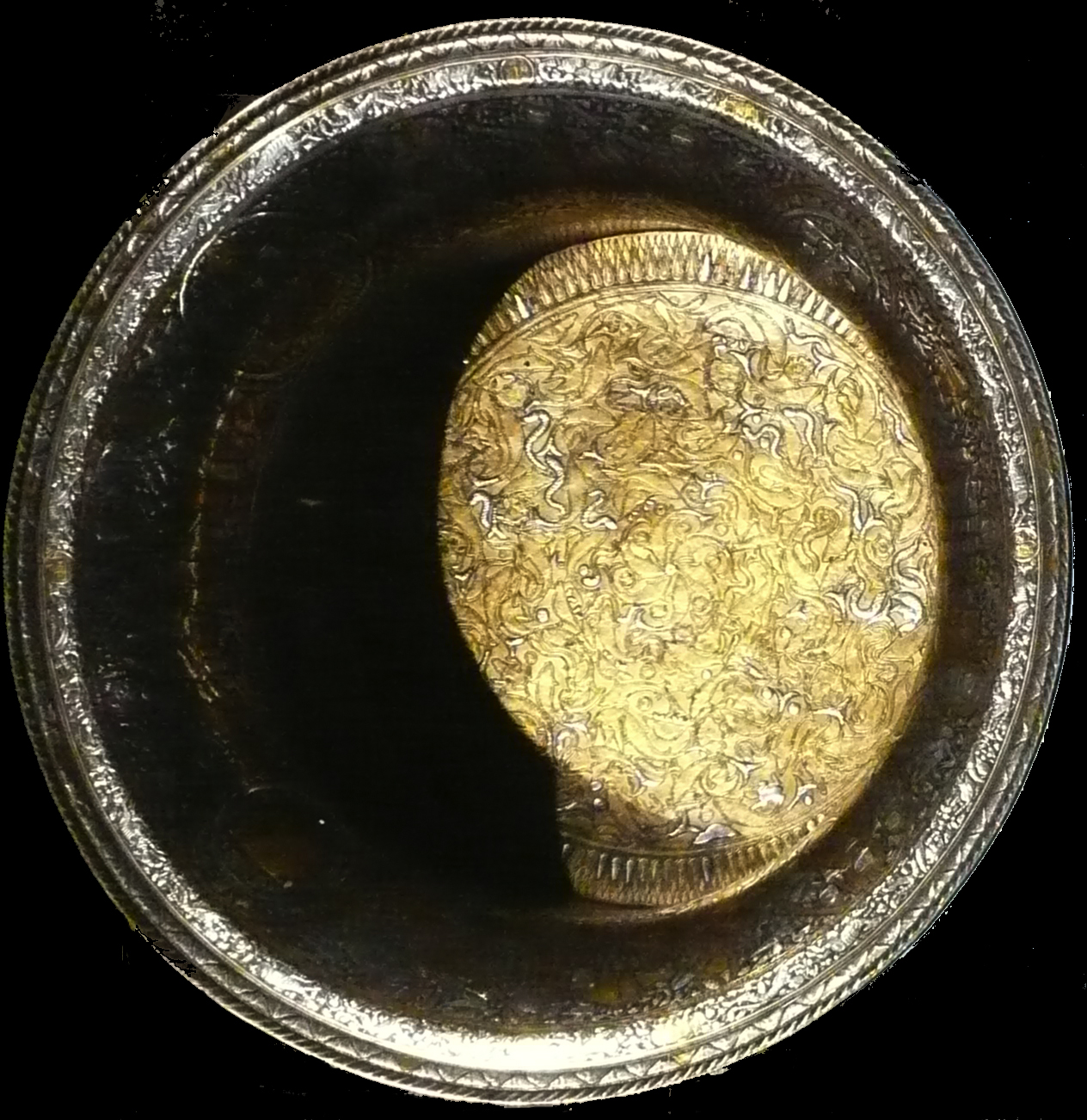
  Round of fish at the bottom of the Baptistery of Saint Louis
- Apart from the round of fish, most of the animals belong to the world of hunting. Some animals are prey such as gazelles, ibex, hares, wild boars, lions, bears, foxes, wolves, cheetahs, ducks, and waders, while others are helpers like tame cheetahs, dogs, and hawks. There are other various animals such as dromedaries, elephants, and horses. Also present are imaginary creatures such as griffins, sphinxes, unicorns, and dragons.
- The round of fish are specifically organized: in the center, six poisons form a radiant pattern around a point. Five concentric circles of fish surround them. However, the general impression is that of a disorder, because between the circles of fish, the artist slipped a varied and disorganized aquatic fauna: ducks, eels, crabs, frogs, a crocodile, a pelican, and two harpies
- The entire decoration, with the exception of the ornament of the edge of the basin, is on a background of interlaced vegetation. In the animal friezes, foliage is organized in cylindrical windings. In the principal registers, the vegetable ornament seems more free-flowing, with the aim of filling every space. The foliage is accentuated by small palm leaves and palmettes divided into three parts. Leaves, possibly derived from the vine leaf pattern, are present in the interior medallions with escutcheons, as well as five-petalled petals inlaid with gold. On the main registers, there are also large plant stems bearing rows of leaves, with flowers present at the end of the stems. There is also a vegetable with a large flower and another indistinct vegetable which is composed of two palms intersecting they lay between the legs of the characters of the headband.

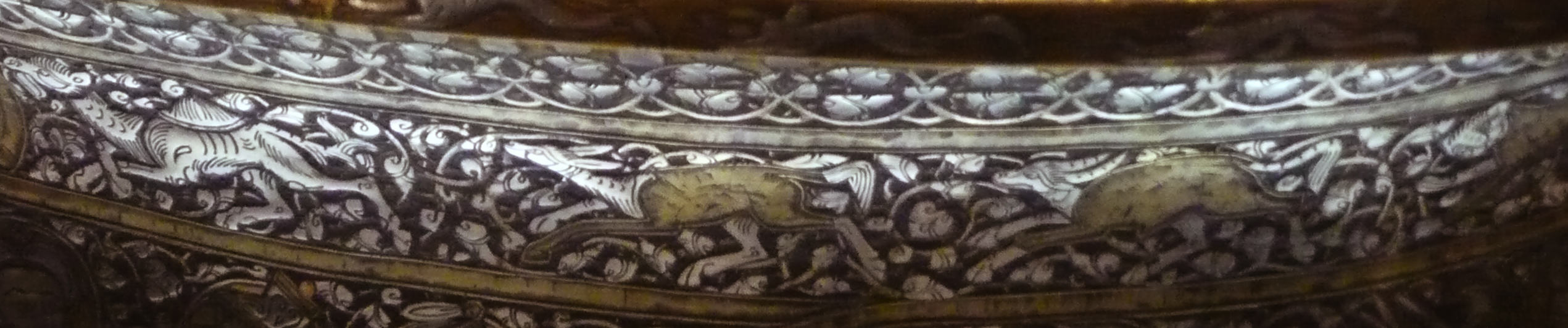
Detail of the frieze.

== Manufacturing: technical and work organization ==
The technique of making this object consists of inlaid metalwork which is still practiced in Cairo to this day. The artist first develops the desired pattern by hammering the brass and then polishing it. Subsequently, he creates the next layer of decorative metal by dividing the surface of the basin into divisions, then drawing the figures and foliage. The artist cuts the patterns out of precious metal and prepares it to be hammered into the brass. The artist then begins working hammers the precious materials, silver and gold, into the copper, and then engraves the details. The final step is coating the bowl with bituminous black material, which enhances the engravings, highlights the contours, and creates contrasts.

This technique appears in Islamic lands in the 12th century, probably in eastern Iran, before spreading quickly to the Syrian world. The Ayyubid dynasty, especially the artists of the "School of Mosul," some of whom worked in Damascus brought this technique to a zenith. The Mamluks, who came to power in 1250, adopted this tradition and produced works of great luxury in the Bahrite period (1250–1382).

Despite its generally stable state of conservation, the Saint Louis Baptistery has lost part of its inlay, either because of the wear of time (which is probably the case for the fish that were covered by water) or by vandals who stole the precious metal. This phenomenon of theft and loss took place mainly at the end of the 14th century, when the precious metals were scarce. However, the majority of the basin's inlays are complete.

The organization of work in the workshops remains difficult to understand because of a lack of written sources. Although coppersmiths appear to sign their work more so than other artisans, they were still considered to be artisans of secondary status, unlikely to attract the attention of their contemporary scholars. The Baptistery bears the signature of one person named Muhammad ibn al-Zayn, who also put his name on a smaller bowl in the Louvre. LA Mayer emphasizes that some works with two signatures show that there is usually at least one artist doing the foundational work of shaping the bowl, and another, the Naqqash, was the main decorative inlayer. When a name is inlaid in silver letters, it usually means that this person was the “master” and inserter. One such name is Muhammad ibn al-Zayn, Al mu'allim. The use of the term al-mu'allim is found in other pieces of Mamluk inlaid metals such as a piece of furniture in the name of an-Nasir Muhammad ibn Qala'un kept at the Museum of Islamic Art in Cairo, or a mirror preserved at the Topkapi Museum.

== Form and style ==
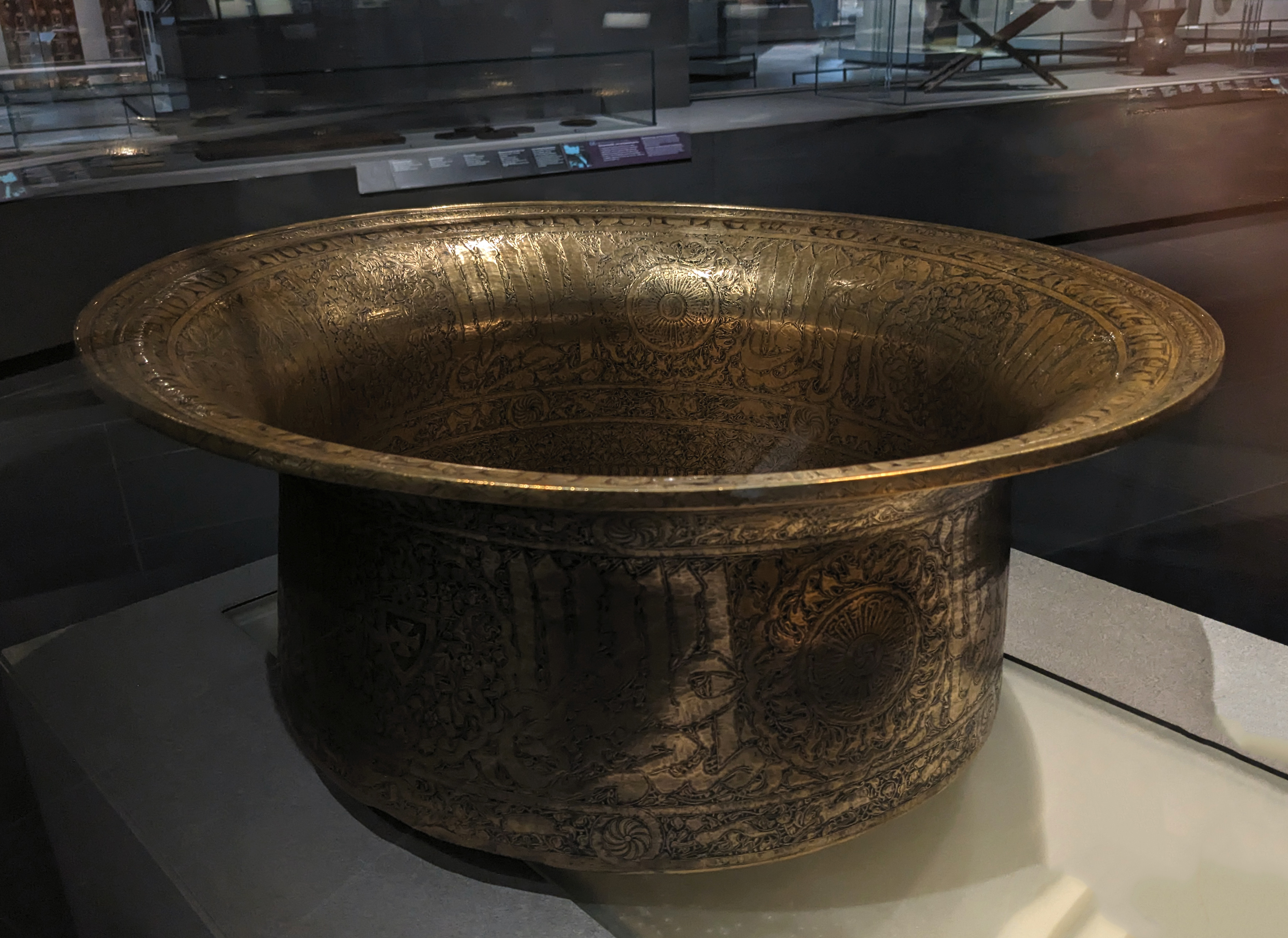
Basin in the name of Hugues de Lusignan, Paris, Louvre Museum, MAO 101

Basins with flared edges had existed since the Ayyubid period: for example, the Arenberg Basin, dated around 1247–1249 and preserved at the Freer Gallery of Art, or the basin in the name of Salih Najm ad-Din Ayyub preserved in the Museum of Islamic Art in Cairo. However, these basins often have a fairly smooth and curved transition zone. With its strongly streamlined profile, angularity, as well as its remarkable dimensions, the Baptistery of Saint Louis moves away from this type. It belongs to a group of basins of similar shape and size, 50 of which two bear the name of Sultan An-Nasir Muhammad ibn Qala'un, one is dedicated to a Sultan of Yemen and another was made to Hugh IV of Lusignan. There is another basin also very close in form and decoration, but is unfinished probably because of a technical accident (a crack in the background) and is kept at the LA Mayer Memorial in Jerusalem, and was attributed to Muhammad ibn al-Zayn by Jonathan M. Bloom.

The general style of the basin is a continuation of previous works. The friezes of animals is an element that predates Islam. All the frieze animals are traditional species in the arts of middle east: all are found, for example, in the copies of Ibn Bakhtishu's Manafi al-Hayawan. In particular, the unicorn chasing the elephant is a recurrent theme of Islamic art, which echoes legends reported by al-Jahiz and al-Qazwini in particular; it is found on lustrous tiles in the thirteenth century in Iran and on bas-reliefs in Konya during the same period. In the same way, the association between the griffin and the sphinx is well established at the time of the creation of the Baptistery. Only the serpentine dragon could have been a novelty that arrived in Egypt with the Mongol invasion; however, they are found in the Syrian zone from the Seljuk period. Rounds of fish including other animals become a motif according to E. Baer at the beginning of the fourteenth century, as shown by an Iranian brass inlaid metal bowl, dated around 1305. For her, these motifs "evoke – it seems – dreams about distant seas and foreign whose waters bring wealth and good fortune. " Several elements would indicate a certain sense of humor on the part of the artist, such as the absurd inscription on the flat, or the presence of a small rabbit represented from the front, for short, which seems to look directly at the viewer.

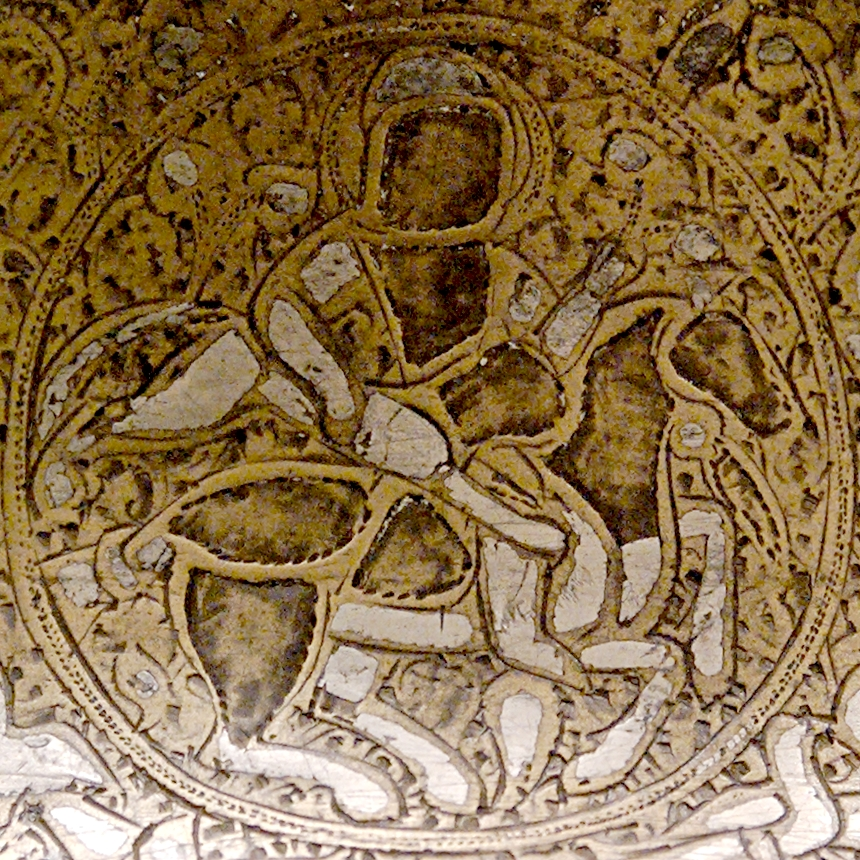
Rider on a Syrian candlestick from the thirteenth century, Paris, Louvre Museum, OA 6035

In the same way, decorative foliage parallels older works. The spiral motif is predominant in Egypt: it is found for example on ivories and Fatimid woodwork. In Ayyubid metals, as on the Basin of Sultan al-'Adil II signed by al-Dhaki, the foliage – as well as the calligraphy of the signature – are very similar to those on the Baptistery. The tall-stemmed flowers bearing rows of leaves fare parallel to Baghdad's painting of the twelfth and thirteenth centuries, such as the Pseudo-Galian's Book of Antidotes, which dates to 1199. There are no new motifs in the Baptistery that are not found in other works. Brought by the Mongol invasions, the group of metalworks (except those of LA Mayer) have a large number of peony flowers in particular. The only peonies of the Baptistery are present on a napkin worn by a character, which could demonstrate his Mongol origin. The five-petalled florets surrounding the blazons in the internal medallions find immediate parallels in the medallions of the other basins in the group.

But the most unusual missing element on the Baptistery is the absence of a large inscription in Thuluth, characteristic of the art of this period. The other basins of the group, with the exception of that of the L. A. Mayer collection, that are unfinished and undated still have large Thuluth inscriptions. J. M. Bloom as R. Ward and S. Makariou both note this incongruity; R. Ward and S. Makariou argue it could be due to Christian ownership of the Baptistery. However, the basin in the name of Hugh de Lusignan in the Louvre bears a large inscription in Thuluth calligraph.

== Interpretations of iconography ==
The interpretation of the iconography of the Baptistery of St. Louis has been controversial since the nineteenth century. Most researchers, including DS Rice, agree that some of the scenes depicted specific events, while some elements, such as genuflection, have no equivalent in other Islamic art and might be purely decorative. However, Rachel Ward argues against this interpretation by pointing out that Mamluks do not have a tradition of portraiture or 'history painting' in their metal art, and that such representation would be inconceivable without an inscription that identifies the scene. She also believes that looking to date the basin based on the costumes represented is absurd, as Mamluk artists worked more abstractly rather than direct representation.

S. Makariou considers R. Ward's hypotheses valid, while other researchers disagree. D. Rice argues, based on the difference in clothing and physical characters of the external friezes, contrasts with the traditional Mamluk costume, that two the basin depicts two distinct groups: panels E1 and E3 depict Turkish emirs and panels E2 and E4 depict Arab servants. Among the emirs, one could be Salar because of his coat of arms, but because of some of the figures around him, like the huntsman (fahhad), the cheetah, and the falconer (bâzyâr) all associated with emirship. The medallions with the scenes of throne might have no particular meaning; on the other hand, there would be narrative continuity between the battle scenes, the severed head being that of the character struck in the previous banner.

In 1984 E. Knauer, in an article devoted to the representation of the Mongols in the painting of trecento, proposes that the baptistery was "a testimony of the lively exchanges between Berke Khan and Baybars I, which culminate with the circumcision of the son of Baybars on September 3, 1264, in the presence of the representative [of the Golden Horde]. E. Knauer supports his point by looking at the unusual character of the double coat of arms; he identifies the lion-shaped one at Baybars, and evokes the idea that the tamga-shaped one would be that of the young circumcised, Berke. He mostly identifies hats as Mongol hats, and believes that their physical type would be that of the Caucasian emirates.

Doris Behrens-Abouseif, in 1989, questions these assumptions. She insists that the types identified as servants by Rice are sometimes associated with aristocratic privilege. For her, each rider in the medallions represents an aspect of the furusiyya, an equestrian art highly valued in the Mamluk period; the entire Baptistery would be an evocation of tournaments (maydân) taking place during ceremonies at the time of Sultan Baybars.

== Sponsor, dating, and location ==
These different hypotheses result in academics dating and locating the Baptistery differently. By his identification of Salar as an emissary represented and sponsor of the work, D. S. Rice proposes a date between 1290 and 1310 . A stylistic comparison with a bowl kept in the Berlin museum and made for Emir Sumul, companion of Salar, allows him to support his hypothesis. He speculates that the lion's coat of arms could be that of Baybars II70. As for localization, the presence of a crocodile, a nilotic animal, makes it look like an Egyptian work.

E. Knauer and D. Behrens-Abouseif, identify the scenes as related to the life of Baybars I, argue for an older dating in the third quarter of the thirteenth century. After having questioned Rice's dating because of the costume, Behrens-Abouseif puts forward several arguments to this effect: the costumes of the non-Mongol emirs are archaic; the strange absence of musicians Baybars hated; the importance of Mongolian traits, to be linked with the influx of Mongol refugees in Cairo under Baybars; the highlighting of charges put in place and renovated by the Baybars reforms; the importance given to the lion in iconography. For her, the work is therefore an order of Sultan Baybars.

On the contrary, R. Ward believes that the Baptistery is an early example of Venetian-Saracenic metal, made in Syria for a European sponsor in the mid-fourteenth century. The quality of the metal does not necessarily mean it was created for the local rulers. According to her; on the contrary, the absence of monumental inscriptions to the titles of a major character shows that this is a work done for a foreign sponsor because it would be labelled if it was meant for local nobility. In the same way, the signatures and the annexed inscriptions would be only a decorative tool, because they would not have been appreciated by a sponsor unable to read Arabic. The shield shape that was kept free of metal and the use of the rampant lion flag (the Lusignans symbol) indicates a European sponsor since there were no comparable Islamic symbols. The dating proposed between 1325 and 1360 is based essentially on the gradual approximation of the age of Baptistery within the group of basins already mentioned, and with a corresponding group of manuscripts made in Damascus between 1334 and 1360. This comparison, the fact that Damascus was recognized in Europe as a center of metal (sensitive in the words "damasquinure" and "damassé") whereas Cairo was closed to foreigners, supports the theory that the manufacturer was in Damascus. This hypothesis could be reinforced by the existence, in Damascus, of an iron gate dated 1340–59, which contains the name Muhammad ibn al-Zayn; however, the identification of the author of the Baptistery with that of the grates of Damascus remains questionable, because it would then be a unique example of an unusual artist who worked both iron and brass metal inlay works. S. Makariou argues this hypotheses and proposes that the lion's coat of arms belong to Hugh IV of Lusignan.

== Bibliography ==
    - Mehmet Aga Oglu, « », Pantheon, vol. III, 1930, p. 454–457
    - (en) Esin Atıl, Washington D.C., Smithsonian Institution Press, 1981
    - (en) Eva Baer, New York, New York University Press, 1998
    - (en) Doris Behrens-Abouseif, « », Islamic Art, n^{o} III, 1988–89, p. 3–9
    - (en) Sheila Blair et Jonathan Bloom, New Haven/London, Yale University Press, 1995
    - (en) Jonathan M. Bloom, « », Islamic art, n^{o} II, 1987, p. 15–26
    - (de) Elfriede R. Knauer, dans, Florence, Sansoni editore, 1984, p. 173–182.
    - Adrien Prévost de Longpérier, « », Revue archéologique, n^{o} VII, 1866, p. 306–309
    - Adrien de Longpérier, « », Comptes rendus des séances de l'Académie des inscriptions et belles-Lettres, vol. 10, n^{o} 10, 1866, p. 291–295 (article disponible sur le portail persée [archive]).
    - Sophie Makariou, Somogy / Louvre éditions, 2012, 59 p.
    - Sophie Makariou, Hazan / Louvre éditions, 2012
    - (en) Leo Ary Mayer, Genève, Albert Kundig, 1952.
- Mayer, Leo Ary (1959). Islamic metalworkers and their works. Genève: Albert Kundig.
    - Aubin-Louis Milin, t. 2, Paris, Drouhin, 1791, p. 62–65, pl. X-XI (disponible sur gallica [archive] et le site de l'INHA [archive]).
    - (en) David Storm Rice, « », Bulletin of the School of Oriental and African Studies, vol. XIII/2, 1950, p. 367–380.
    - David Storm Rice, Éditions du Chêne, 1951, 26 p..
    - (en) Rachel Ward, Londres, British Museum Press, 1993.
    - (en) Rachel Ward, dans Charles Burnett, Anna Contadini, Londres, The Warburg Institute, 1999, p. 113–132.
    - Mols L. E. M., Mamluk Metalwork Fittings in Their Artistic and Architectural Context, Delft, Eburon, 2006
    - Poncet de La Grave G., Mémoires intéressants pour servir à l’histoire de France, ou tableau historique [...] des maisons royales, châteaux et parcs des rois de France, contenant Vincennes et toutes ses dépendances, Paris, Nyons, 2 vol., 1788.
    - Rüdt de Collenberg W. H., (( L'héraldique de Chypre)), in Cahier d'héraldique, III, Mélanges héraldiques, Paris, CNRS Editions, 1977, p. 86–157
    - Van Berchem M., Matériaux pour un corpus inscriptionum arabicarum, 2 partie, Syrie du Sud, t. I, Jerusalem ((ville)) (Memoires publies par les membres de l’Institute francais d'archeologie orientale du Caire, t. 43), Le Caire, Imprimerie de l’IFAO, 1922.
    - Ward R., (( Brass, Gold, and Silver from Mamluk Egypt: Metal Vessels Made for Sultan al-Nasir Muhammad. A memorial Lecture for Marc Zebroviski Given at the Royal Asiatic Society in May 2002)), Journal of the Royal Asiatic Society, vol. XIV, no 1, avril 2004, p 60–73.
    - Wiet G., Catalogue général du musée arabe du Caire: objets en cuivre, Le Caire, Imprimerie de l’IFAO, 1932.
    - Allan J.W., Islamic Metalwork, the Nuhad Es-Said Collection, Londres, Sotheby, 1982.
    - Allan J.W., ((Muhammad ibn al-Zain: Craftsman in Cups, Thrones and Window Grilles?)), Levant, n 28, 1996, p. 199–208
    - Atil E. Art of the Arab World, Washington, Freer Gallery, Smithsonian Institution, 1975
    - Europa and the Orient: 800–1900, Sievernich G. et Budde H. (dir), cat. Exp., Berlin, Martin Gropius Bau, 1989; Munich, Bertelsmann Lexikon, 1989.
    - Billot C., Chartes et documents de la Sainte-Chapelle de Vincennes (XIV et XV Siècles), Paris, CNRS Editions, 1984.
    - Brunschvig R., ((Metiers vils en Islam)), Studia Islamica, XVI, 1962, p. 41–60.
    - Chapelot J., ((Un Objet d’exception: le baptistère de Saint Louis de la Sainte-Chapelle de Vincennes au département des Arts de L'Islam du musée du Louvre)), Bulletin de la Société de Amis de Vincennes, n 58, 2007, p. 5–25.
    - Conermann S., ((Tankiz)), in Encyclopedie de I’Islam, 2nd ed., vol. X, Leyde, Brill, 1998, p. 201.
    - Bassin Dit « baptistère de Saint Louis ». Vers -1340 1320. Laiton martelé, décor incrusté d’or, d’argent et de pâte noire, H. 22 cm ; D. ouverture 50,2 cm. Louvre. https://www.louvre.fr/oeuvre-notices/bassin-dit-baptistere-de-saint-louis.
