= Henry Barbet de Jouy =

French art historian, archaeologist, and curator (1812–1896)

Joseph-Henry Barbet de Jouy
- Born: July 16, 1812; Canteleu, France
- Died: May 26, 1896 (aged 83); Paris, France
- Education: Faculty of Law of Paris; École des Beaux-Arts
- Occupations: Archaeologist, art historian, curator
- Employer: Louvre
- Known for: Saving the Louvre during Bloody Week (1871); Director of the Louvre (1879–1881)
- Awards: Knight of the Legion of Honor; Académie des Beaux-Arts (elected 1880)

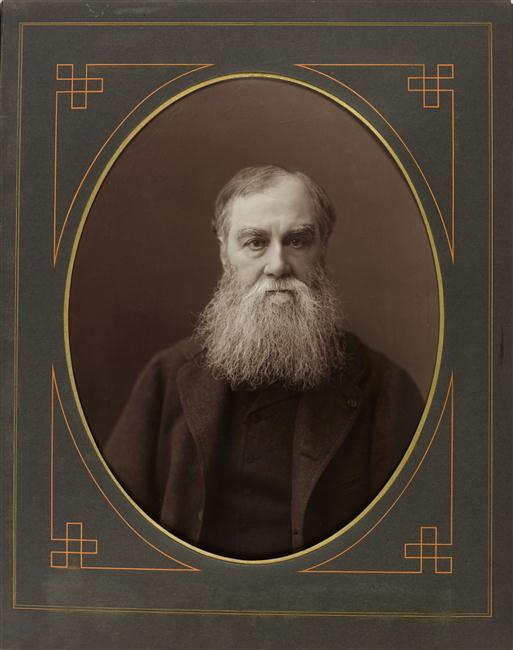
Henry Barbet de Jouy; photograph by Eugène Pirou

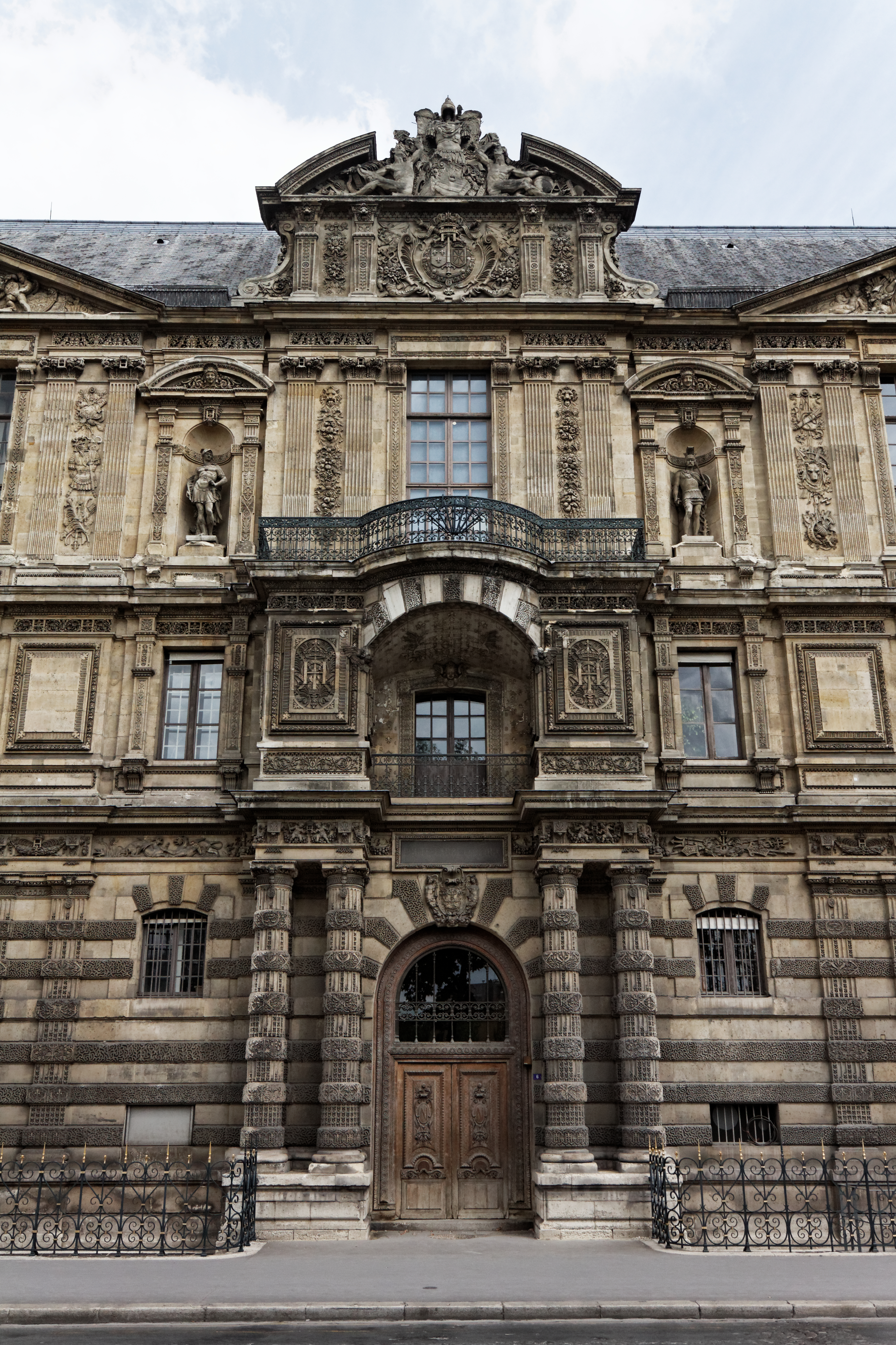
Le Porte Barbet de Jouy, at the Louvre

Joseph-Henry Barbet de Jouy (16 July 1812, Canteleu – 26 May 1896, Paris) was a French archaeologist, art historian, and curator.

== Biography ==
His father was the industrialist, Jacques-Juste Barbet de Jouy. From 1832 to 1840, he studied at both the Faculty of Law of Paris, and the architecture section of the École des Beaux-Arts. In 1850, he began working in the department of Medieval and Renaissance art at the Louvre. Following a trip to Italy in 1855, he was named Assistant Curator, then promoted to Curator in 1863, and his duties were expanded to include the collection in the associated Musée des Souverains.

At this time, he also wrote several major studies; notably Description des sculptures modernes (1856), Mosaiques chrétiennes des basiliques et églises de Rome (1857), and Fontes du primatice, dans le jardin de l'Empereur aux Tuilleries (1860), which earned him the title of Knight in the Legion of Honor.

From 1870 to 1871, he was given responsibility for the museum's security. In 1871, during Bloody Week, the Communards set fire to the Palais-Royal and the Tuilleries, placing the Louvre in danger. Thanks to the persistence of Jouy and Martian de Bernardy de Sigoyer, a Commander in the Chasseurs, who placed his men at Jouy's disposal, the fire was prevented from spreading. Sigoyer was killed the next day. Jouy is considered a cultural hero in France for his efforts to save the Louvre, and an entrance to the museum has been named after him.

When peace had been restored, he was appointed Conservator for what is now known as the Réunion des Musées Nationaux (1871-1879) and, finally, Director of the Louvre (1879-1881). He was elected to the Académie des Beaux-Arts in 1880, where he took Seat #10 in the "Unattached" section.
