= Lorillard (disambiguation) =

Lorillard may refer to:

== Places ==
- Lorillard Place, a street in the Belmont section of the Bronx, located between Fordham Road and St Barnabas Hospital, named for brothers George L. Lorillard and Pierre Lorillard IV
- Lorillard River, a river in the Nunavut territory of Canada
- Ville Lorillard (Lorillard City) or Yaxchilan, an ancient Mayan city

== People with the name ==
- Elaine Lorillard (1914-2007), American socialite and co-founder of the Newport Jazz Festival and the Newport Folk Festival with her then-husband Louis Livingston Lorillard
- Louis Livingston Lorillard (1919–1986), co-founder of the Newport Jazz Festival and the Newport Folk Festival with his then-wife Elaine Guthrie Lorillard, and a descendant of Pierre Abraham Lorillard
- Pierre Abraham Lorillard (1742-1776), American founder of P. Lorillard and Company, which developed into the Lorillard Tobacco Company
  - Pierre Lorillard II (1764-1843), American tobacco manufacturer, son of Pierre Abraham Lorillard
    - Dorothea Anne Lorillard (1798–1866), daughter of Pierre Lorillard II and wife of John David Wolfe (1792–1872), a real estate developer
      - Catharine Lorillard Wolfe (1828–1887), philanthropist and granddaughter of Pierre Lorillard III
    - Pierre Lorillard III (1796-1867), American country club developer, grandson of Pierre Abraham Lorillard, son of Pierre Lorillard II
      - Catherine Lorillard Kernochan (1835–1917), daughter of Pierre Lorillard III
      - Eva Lorillard (1847–1903), daughter of Pierre Lorillard III
      - George L. Lorillard (1843-1892), American tobacco manufacturer, son of Pierre Lorillard III
      - Louis Lasher Lorillard (1849–1910), brother-in law of Rhode Island Governor Robert Livingston Beeckman, son of Pierre Lorillard III
      - Mary Lorillard Barbey (1841–1926), daughter of Pierre Lorillard III
      - Pierre Lorillard IV (1833-1901), American tobacco manufacturer, great-grandson of Pierre Abraham Lorillard, son of Pierre Lorillard III
        - Nathaniel Griswold Lorillard (1862–1888)
        - Pierre Lorillard V (1860–1940), son-in-law of James Jerome Hill and son or Pierre Lorillard IV
- Lorillard S. Spencer, great-grandson of Pierre Lorillard II

== Brands and enterprises ==
- Lorillard Snuff Mill, the oldest existing tobacco manufacturing building in the United States
- Lorillard Tobacco Company, an American tobacco company
