= William H. Force =

American merchant

- Born: May 11, 1852; Brooklyn, New York, U.S.
- Died: May 19, 1917 (aged 65); Manhattan
- Occupation: Merchant
- Spouse: Katherine Arvilla Talmage
- Children: Katherine Emmons Force; Madeleine Talmage Force

William Hurlbut Force (May 11, 1852 – May 19, 1917) was an American merchant.

== Early life ==
Force was born in Brooklyn, New York on May 11, 1852. He was a son of William Force Jr. (1824–1867) and Mary Sophia (née Emmons) Force (1821–1892). He had two sisters, Julia Bancroft Force (1849-1928), wife of John Dean Fish Jr., and Mary Helen Force (1864-1893), wife of Theodore Ledyard Cuyler Jr. (son of Theodore L. Cuyler) and a brother, George Wilbur Force (1854-1887). His uncle was Ephraim S. Force.

Force was educated at the Dutchess County Academy in Poughkeepsie, New York.

== Career ==
Force was a member of a well-established business family and he owned the successful shipping firm William H. Force and Co. (established in 1873), and his father had been prosperous in the manufacturing industry. His firm was located at 78 Front Street.

He was also a director of the Staten Island Rapid Transit R.R. Co., and United Casualty Co., and the New York Board of Trade and Transportation.

== Personal life ==
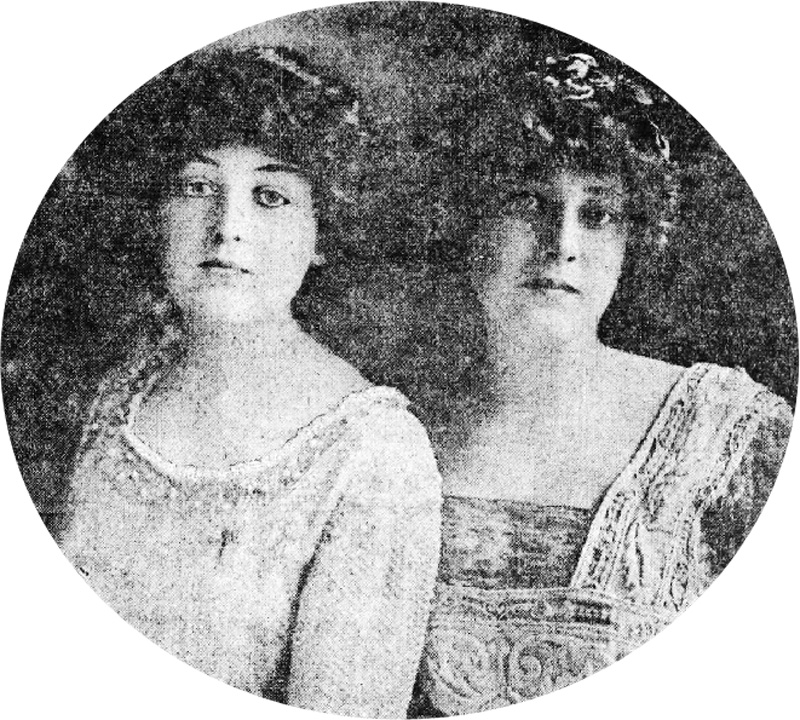
Force's daughters, Katherine and Madeleine.

In 1889 Force was married to New Jersey native Katherine Arvilla Talmage (1863–1939), a daughter of Tunis V. P. Talmage and Magdalene (née de Forest) Talmage. She was also a granddaughter of former Brooklyn mayor Thomas G. Talmage. Together, they were the parents of:

- Katherine Emmons Force (1891–1956), who married Lorillard S. Spencer in 1922.
- Madeleine Talmage Force (1893–1940), who married John Jacob Astor IV in 1911 shortly before his death aboard the Titanic in 1912. She married William Karl Dick in 1916. They divorced in 1933, the same year she married Enzo Fiermonte. They marriage also ended in divorce in 1938.

William owned a well regard art collection and was part of Brooklyn high society. He was also a member of several prestigious clubs in the city.

Force died at 11 East 68th Street, their residence in Manhattan, on May 19, 1917. His widow, who inherited his entire estate, died at Chastellux, their daughter Katherine's villa in Newport in August 1939.

=== Descendants ===
Through his daughter Madeleine, he was a grandfather of John Jacob Astor VI (1912–1992), William Force Dick (1917–1961), and John Henry Dick (1919–1995).
