= Louis Lasher Lorillard =

American clubman

Louis Lasher Lorillard (November 26, 1849 – October 22, 1910) was a prominent American clubman.

== Personal life ==
Louis was born on November 26, 1849, in New York City. He was the son of Pierre Lorillard III (1796–1867) and Catherine (née Griswold) Lorillard. Among his large family were siblings, Pierre Lorillard IV; Catherine Lorillard, wife of James Powell Kernochan; Jacob Lorillard; Mary Lorillard, wife of Henry Isaac Barbey; George Lyndes Lorillard, and Eva Lorillard, wife of Lawrence Kip.

His paternal grandparents were Pierre Lorillard II and Maria Dorothea (née Schultz) Lorillard. In 1760, his great-grandfather founded P. Lorillard and Company in New York City to process tobacco, cigars, and snuff which, today, is the oldest tobacco company in the U.S. His mother's family owned "the great New York mercantile house of N. L. & G. Griswold, known to their rivals as "No Loss and Great Gain Griswold," importers of rum, sugar, and tea."

== Career ==
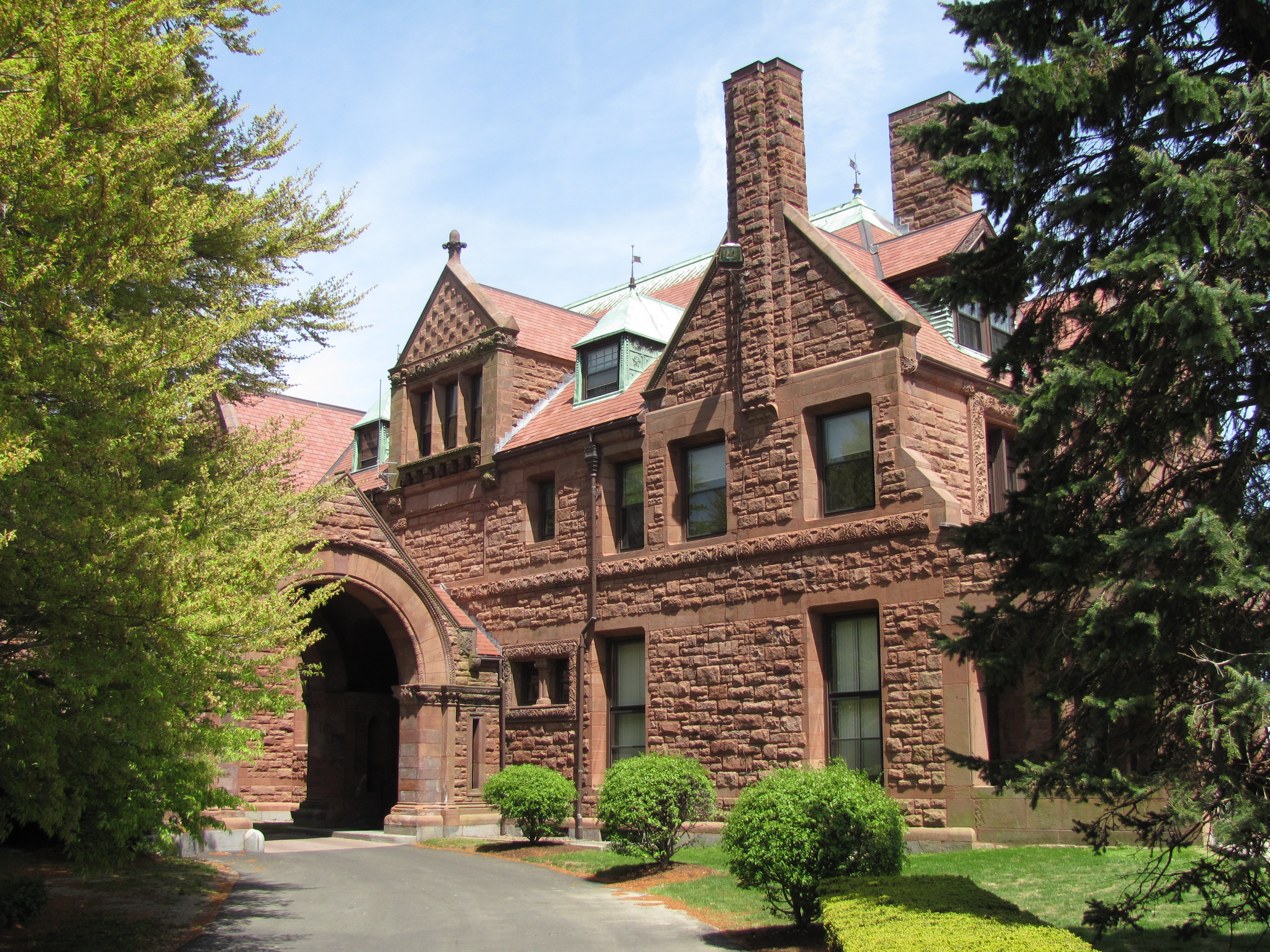
Lorillard's Vinland Estate in Newport.

Upon his father's death in 1867, eighteen year old Louis, and his siblings, inherited a large fortune and was "regarded as one of the wealthiest young men in New York." Like his brothers, he was an "ardent sportsman, and his fancies in this direction seemed to turn especially to yachting. His first yacht, the Eva" was named after his younger sister. He later owned The Wanderer, a larger and faster yacht that was the "most up-to-date type of keel ocean-going schooner."

He was a member of the New York Yacht Club, the Knickerbocker Club, Newport Reading Club and The Travellers Club in Paris. In 1906 he became a member of the New York Society of the Cincinnati by right of his descent from Colonel John Lasher. He was succeeded in the Society by his son Louis.

In 1896, Lorillard sold his Vinland Estate at Ochre Point in Newport, Rhode Island, to Hamilton McKown Twombly and his wife, Florence Adele Vanderbilt Twombly. He had inherited Vinland, which was built in 1882 by Peabody & Stearns, from his aunt, Catharine Lorillard Wolfe.

== Personal life ==
In 1874, Lorillard was married to Katherine Livingston Beeckman (1855–1941), sister of Rhode Island Governor Robert Livingston Beeckman. Together, they were the parents of four sons and a daughter:

- Louis Lasher Lorillard Jr. (1875–1938), who married Edith Norman Hunter in 1914.
  - Louis Livingston Lorillard (1919-1987) who while married to Elaine Lorillard cofounded the Newport Jazz Festival with her and George Wein.
- Mary Lorillard (1875–1878), who died young.
- George L. Lorillard (c. 1877 - ?), who lived in Paris, France.
- Beeckman Lorillard (1884–1923), who married Katherine Doyle.
- Harold Livingston Lorillard (1888–1889), who died in infancy.

Lorillard died at the Mercedes Hotel in Paris on October 22, 1910. He was buried at Saint Mary's Episcopal Churchyard in Portsmouth, Rhode Island. In his will, his wife received one-fifth of the income from the estate he inherited from his father, but only one-tenth if she remarried, with the remainder of the estate split between his living sons.
