= Pierre Lorillard =

Pierre Lorillard may refer to:

- Pierre Abraham Lorillard (1742–1776), tobacconist of New York City
- Pierre Lorillard II (1764–1843), American tobacco manufacturer, industrialist and banker
- Pierre Lorillard III (1796–1867), original developer of Tuxedo Club, one of the nation's early country clubs
- Pierre Lorillard IV (1833–1901), American tobacco manufacturer and thoroughbred race horse owner
