= Tunis V. P. Talmage =

American politician

Member of the New York State Assembly for Kings County, 4th District
- In office 1875–1876
- Preceded by: Theodore N. Melvin
- Succeeded by: James G. Tighe

Personal details
- Born: Tunis Van Pelt Talmage; July 24, 1832 Clinton, New Jersey
- Died: November 28, 1909 (aged 77) Brooklyn, New York
- Party: Democratic
- Spouse: Magdalene Van Nest de Forest (after 1853)
- Relations: Jacob W. Miller (uncle); Thomas De Witt Talmage (cousin); John Van Nest Talmage (cousin); Katherine Emmons Force (granddaughter); Madeleine Astor (granddaughter)
- Children: 3
- Parent(s): Thomas G. Talmage; Dorothy Miller

Military service
- Branch/service: 56th New York Infantry Regiment
- Rank: Captain
- Battles/wars: U.S. Civil War • Gettysburg campaign

Tunis Van Pelt Talmage (July 24, 1832 – November 28, 1909) was an American businessman and politician from New York.

== Life ==
Talmage was born on July 24, 1832, in Clinton, New Jersey, the son of Thomas Goyn Talmage and Dorothy Miller. He grew up in New York City until he was eight, after which he lived in Brooklyn. His father was Mayor of Brooklyn, and his uncle Jacob W. Miller was a United States Senator from New Jersey. Among his cousins were attorney George Macculloch Miller and clergyman John Van Nest Talmage and Thomas De Witt Talmage.

Talmage attended the New Brunswick Grammar School in New Jersey.

== Career ==
In 1849, he moved to San Francisco and worked in the general merchandise establishment of Talmage, Green & Co. Two years later, he returned to Brooklyn and obtained a contract to pave and grade the streets. After seven years in that business, he established himself in the coal business. In 1860, he was elected supervisor of the Eighth Ward. A year later, he served on the committee of volunteers that relieved families of soldiers killed in the American Civil War. In 1862, he was elected alderman from the Eighth Ward, and in 1864 he was re-elected and made president of the board.

During the Civil War, Talmage helped raise the 56th New York Infantry Regiment, which his brother was major of. Governor Morgan appointed him captain of the regiment, and he joined the regiment in the front during the Gettysburg campaign. He remained in active service until the end of the campaign, at which point he resigned. In 1865, he came within one vote of receiving the mayoral nomination, losing the nomination to Martin Kalbfleisch. In 1867, he unsuccessfully ran for mayor as an independent Democrat.

In 1874, Talmage was elected to the New York State Assembly as a Democrat, representing the Kings County 4th District (Wards 5, 10, and 22 of Brooklyn). He served in the Assembly in 1875 and 1876. In the Assembly, he advocated Governor Tilden's reform measures. He also introduced and carried through a readjustment of Prospect Park taxes, which shifted taxation from property holders contiguous to the Park to the entire city. In 1882, he went from the retail coal business to the wholesale coal trade. He was also involved in real estate.

== Personal life ==
In 1853, he married Magdalene Van Nest de Forest (1836–1905), a daughter of John J. de Forest and Madeline (née Van Nest). Their children were:

- Magdalen Talmage Dodge (1854–1941), who married Francis Edward Dodge (1841–1926) of New York City.
- William De forest Talmage (1860–1941)
- Katherine Arvilla Talmage (1863–1939), who married William H. Force in 1889.

Talmage was affiliated with the Crescent Athletic Club. He was a member of the Dutch Reformed Church until 1898, when he became a member and trustee of the Park Congregational Church.

Talmage died at home at 216 Eighth Avenue following a 18-week illness that left him bedridden the entire time on November 28, 1909. He was buried in Green-Wood Cemetery.

=== Descendants ===
Through his daughter Katherine, he was a grandfather of Katherine Emmons Force (1891–1956), (wife of Lorillard S. Spencer), and Madeleine Talmage Force (wife of John Jacob Astor IV, William Karl Dick, and Enzo Fiermonte).

New York State Assembly
Preceded by Theodore N. Melvin	New York State Assembly; Kings County, 4th District; 1875–1876	Succeeded by James G. Tighe
