= Caroline Berryman Spencer =

American journalist (1861–1948)

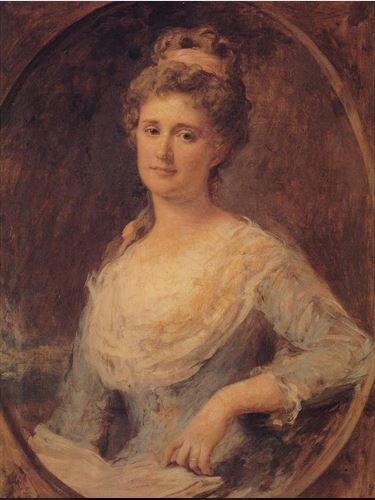
- Born: Caroline Suydam Berryman; December 28, 1861; New Haven, Connecticut
- Died: April 6, 1948 (aged 86); Blue Bird Cottage; Newport, Rhode Island
- Spouse: Lorillard Spencer Jr. (m. 1882; died 1912)
- Children: Lorillard Suydam Spencer; Lynette Suydam Spencer; Nina Gladys Spencer
- Parent(s): Charles Henry Berryman; Harriett Whitney Berryman

Caroline Suydam Berryman Spencer (December 28, 1861 – April 6, 1948) was an American socialite who lived in New York City and Newport, Rhode Island. She served as editor of Illustrated American.

== Early life ==
Caroline Suydam Berryman was born on December 28, 1861, in New Haven, Connecticut, to a very wealthy and socially prominent family. She was a daughter of Charles Henry Berryman (1833–1893) and Harriett (née Whitney) Berryman (1838–1912) of the Whitney family. Her siblings included Henry Whitney Berryman (husband of Edith "Esta" Green of Goole, England) and Georgiana Louise Berryman (wife of Swiss merchant Henry Casimir de Rham). Their paternal grandparents were Edwin Upshur Berryman and Maria (née Coster) Berryman, who both died young. The siblings' maternal grandparents were Hannah (née Lawrence) Whitney and Henry Whitney (a son of Harriet (née Suydam) Whitney and Stephen Whitney, one of the wealthiest merchants in New York City). Other relatives were aunts Cornelia Lawrence Whitney (the wife of John Gerard Heckscher), Maria Whitney (wife of Robert Cambridge Livingston from the Livingston family), and Caroline Suydam Whitney (wife of Cornelius Fellowes).

== Personal life ==
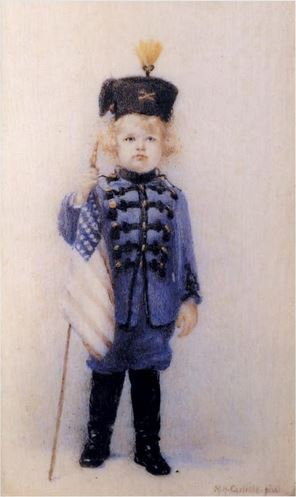
Spencer's only son, Lorillard S. Spencer by Mary Helen Carlisle, 1888.

On October 3, 1882, she married Lorillard Spencer Jr. (1860–1912), a son of Lorillard Spencer and Sarah (née Griswold) Spencer of the Griswold family. His paternal grandparents were Eleanora Eliza (née Lorillard) Spencer (daughter of Pierre Lorillard II) and William Augustus Spencer (son of U.S. Representative Ambrose Spencer and brother of John Canfield Spencer, the U.S. Secretary of War and Treasury). Among his siblings was sister, Eleanor Spencer (wife of Don Virginius Cenci, 6th Prince of Vicovaro) and brother William Augustus Spencer, who died aboard the Titanic. Together, they were the parents of two daughters who died in infancy, and a son, who also predeceased her:

- Lorillard Suydam Spencer (1883–1939), who served as president of Atlantic Aircraft and married Mary Ridgeley Sands in 1905. After their divorce in 1922, he married Katherine Emmons Force.
- Lynette Suydam Spencer (1885–1887), who died young.
- Nina Gladys Spencer (1888–1888), who died in infancy.

They had a home in Newport known as Chastellux, "one of the most beautiful places in that city." After the death of her husband, who owned The Illustrated American, Spencer became a missionary in the Philippines. She died at age 86 on April 6, 1948, at her home, Blue Bird Cottage, in Newport, Rhode Island. She was buried in Green-Wood Cemetery in Brooklyn, New York.
