= Ambrose Spencer =

American politician (1765–1848)

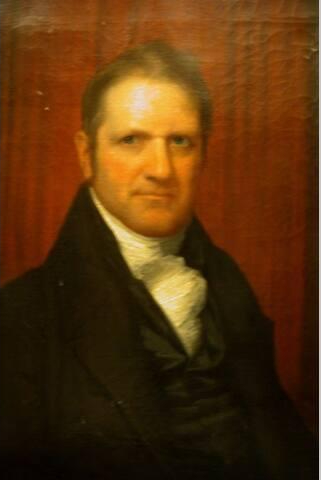
- Portrait by John Wesley Jarvis, c. 1818

Member of the U.S. House of Representatives from New York's 10th district
- In office March 4, 1829 – March 3, 1831
- Preceded by: Stephen Van Rensselaer
- Succeeded by: Albert Gallup

Mayor of Albany, New York
- In office March 10, 1824 – January 1, 1826
- Preceded by: Charles E. Dudley
- Succeeded by: James Stevenson

New York Attorney General
- In office 1802–1804
- Governor: George Clinton
- Preceded by: Josiah Ogden Hoffman
- Succeeded by: John Woodworth

Personal details
- Born: December 13, 1765 Salisbury, Connecticut Colony, British America
- Died: March 13, 1848 (aged 82) Lyons, New York, U.S.
- Resting place: Albany Rural Cemetery
- Spouses: Laura Canfield (m. 1784; died 1807) Mary Clinton (m. 1808; died 1808) Katherine Clinton (m. 1810; died 1837)
- Children: 6, including John Canfield
- Relatives: Philip Spencer (grandson); DeWitt Clinton (brother-in-law); John Townsend (son-in-law)
- Education: Yale College; Harvard University

Ambrose Spencer (December 13, 1765 – March 13, 1848) was an American lawyer and politician.

== Early life ==
Ambrose Spencer was born on December 13, 1765, in Salisbury in the Connecticut Colony. He was the son of Philip Spencer and Mary (née Moore) Spencer. His brother was Philip Spencer.

James B. Spencer (1781–1848), also a U.S Representative, was a distant cousin of his.

He attended Yale College from 1779 to 1782, and graduated from Harvard University in 1783. He studied law with John Canfield (ca.1740-1786) at Sharon, Connecticut, with John Bay at Claverack, New York, and with Ezekiel Gilbert at Hudson, New York.

== Career ==
He was admitted to the bar and commenced practice in Hudson, New York, where he was city clerk from 1786 until 1793. He was a member of the New York State Assembly from 1793 to 1795, and of the New York State Senate from 1795 to 1804.

From 1796 to 1801, he was Assistant Attorney General for the Third District, comprising Columbia and Rensselaer counties. He was New York Attorney General from 1802 to 1804. From 1804 to 1819, he was an associate justice of the New York Supreme Court, and chief justice from 1819 until the end of 1822. He was legislated out of office by the State Constitution of 1821. Governor Joseph C. Yates nominated him to be re-appointed, but this was rejected by Bucktails majority in the State Senate, Spencer having been the longtime leader of the Clintonians.

Spencer was a presidential elector in 1808 and a delegate to the New York State Constitutional Convention of 1821. On March 8, 1824, he was elected Mayor of Albany, over John Lansing Jr., taking office on March 10, 1824. He was reelected on January 1, 1825, and served until January 1, 1826.

=== United States Congress ===
In 1825, he was the Clintonian candidate for U.S. Senator from New York, and received a majority in the State Assembly. The Bucktails majority in the State Senate did not nominate any candidate, thus preventing Spencer's election on joint ballot. The seat remained vacant until the election of Nathan Sanford in 1826. Afterwards Spencer resumed the practice of law in Albany.

He was elected to the 21st United States Congress, serving from March 4, 1829, to March 3, 1831; during this Congress, he was a member of the Committee on Agriculture. He was one of the impeachment managers appointed by the House of Representatives in 1830 to conduct the impeachment proceedings against Judge James H. Peck of the U.S. District Court for the District of Missouri.

=== Later life ===
In 1839, he moved to Lyons, New York, and engaged in agricultural pursuits. He presided over the 1844 Whig National Convention in Baltimore, Maryland.

== Personal life ==
On February 18, 1784, he married Laura Canfield (1768–1807), the daughter of John Canfield (1740–1786) and Dorcas (née Buell) Canfield (1742–1812). Together, they were the parents of:

- John Canfield Spencer (1788–1855), who was U.S. Secretary of War and U.S. Secretary of the Treasury under President John Tyler.
- Abigail "Abby" Spencer (1790–1839), who married Albany Mayor John Townsend.
- William Augustus Spencer (1792–1854), who was married to Eleanora Eliza Lorillard (1801–1843), the daughter of Peter Abraham Lorillard
- Ambrose Spencer Jr. (1795–1814), who served as aide-de-camp to Major-General Jacob Jennings Brown during the War of 1812.
- Theodore Spencer (1800–), an attorney who became a Presbyterian minister who married Catharine Vosburgh, daughter of Myndert T. Vosburgh.
- Laura Isabella Spencer (1803–1825), who married Robert Gilchrist, of New York.

After the death of Ambrose's first wife in 1807, in 1808 he married Mary Clinton (1773–1808), the daughter of James Clinton and sister of New York Governor DeWitt Clinton, who had previously been married to Robert Burrage Norton. After Mary's early death, he married her sister Katherine Clinton (1778–1837), who had previously been married to Samuel Lake Norton.

In 1848, he died in Lyons and was buried at the Albany Rural Cemetery in Menands, New York.

=== Legacy ===
Coat of Arms of Ambrose Spencer

The University of Pennsylvania awarded him the degree of LL.D. in 1819, and Harvard the same in 1821. The town of Spencer in New York is named after him.

=== Descendants ===
His grandson, Philip Spencer (1823–1842), was executed for mutiny in 1842. He was the grandfather of Lorrilard Spencer (1827–1888), great-grandfather of Lorrilard Spencer (1860–1912), who was married to Caroline Berryman Spencer, and 2x great-grandfather of Lorillard Spencer (1883–1939), who was president of Atlantic Aircraft and was married to Katherine Emmons Force (1891–1956), both of whom were prominent in Newport, Rhode Island, society.

Legal offices
Preceded by Josiah Ogden Hoffman	New York Attorney General; 1802–1804	Succeeded by John Woodworth
U.S. House of Representatives
Preceded by Stephen Van Rensselaer	Member of the U.S. House of Representatives from New York's 10th congressional district 1829–1831	Succeeded by Gerrit Lansing
