= Theodore N. Melvin =

American politician

Theodore Noble Melvin (December 1, 1846 – October 5, 1897) was an American lawyer and politician from New York.

== Life ==
Melvin was born on December 1, 1846, in New York City, New York. His father was Solomon Melvin, a prominent lawyer in the city and a captain of the Old Light Guard.

Melvin attended Columbia College, but didn't stay there long enough to graduate. He studied law with J. S. Lawrence of New York City and was admitted to the bar in 1868. He then practiced law in Brooklyn and formed a partnership with Judge W. Henry Gale. He was a member of the Protestant Episcopal Church.

During the 1872 presidential election, Melvin stumped in parts of the state for Horace Greeley. In 1873, he was elected to the New York State Assembly as a Democrat, representing the Kings County 4th District (Wards 5, 10, and 22 of Brooklyn). He was elected over three candidates, a Republican and two Independent Democrats. He served in the Assembly in 1874. He spoke on the Assembly floor on issues related to the interests of New York City and Brooklyn.

Melvin died at his home in the Beresford on October 5, 1897. He was buried in Green-Wood Cemetery.

New York State Assembly
Preceded by James Watt	New York State Assembly; Kings County, 4th District; 1874	Succeeded by Tunis V. P. Talmage
