= Lawrence Kip =

American soldier, author and sportsman

- Born: September 17, 1836; Morristown, New Jersey, U.S.
- Died: November 17, 1899 (aged 63); New York City, New York, U.S.
- Other name: Col. Kip
- Education: United States Military Academy
- Spouse: Eva Lorillard (m. 1867)
- Children: 3, including Edith
- Parent(s): William Ingraham Kip; Maria Elizabeth Lawrence
- Relatives: Leonard Kip (uncle)

Lawrence Kip (September 17, 1836 – November 17, 1899) was an American soldier, author, and sportsman who was prominent in New York society during the Gilded Age.

== Early life ==
Kip was born on September 17, 1836, in Morristown, New Jersey. He was the son of the Rt. Rev. William Ingraham Kip (1811–1893), and Maria Elizabeth (née Lawrence) Kip (1812–1893). His younger brother was William Ingraham Kip Jr., who married Elizabeth Clementine Kinney, the daughter of the U.S. Ambassador to Italy, William Burnet Kinney. Kip's father was a prominent minister who served at Grace Church before becoming the Episcopal Bishop of California until his death in 1893.

His paternal grandparents were Leonard Kip and Maria (née Ingraham) Kip and his uncle was author Leonard Kip. He was descended from Hendrick Hendricksen Kip, one of the nine original assemblymen serving in New Amsterdam from 1647 under Pieter Stuyvesant, Governor of New Netherlands. His ancestors were the namesake of Kips Bay in Manhattan. His maternal grandparents were merchant banker Isaac Lawrence and Cornelia (née Beach) Lawrence, herself the daughter of a minister of Trinity Church.

Kip attended the Churchill Military Academy at Sing Sing, and was appointed Cadet at the United States Military Academy at West Point in June 1853.

== Career ==
Following his graduation from West Point, he was commissioned a Second lieutenant, Third Artillery in June 1857 and became part of the expedition under General Wright against the northern Indians. During this campaign, he reportedly distinguished himself in the Battle of Four Lakes and Spokane Plains and acted as Adjutant of the Artillery Battalion. In 1859, Kip published an account of the campaign in a book entitled Army Life on the Pacific.

In 1861, at the beginning of the U.S. Civil War, he was Adjutant of the Third Artillery. Shortly thereafter, he resigned to join the staff of General Edwin Vose Sumner's as senior aide-de-camp, achieving the rank of Major. He was a part of the Army of the Potomac which saw action in the Battles of Yorktown, Williamsburg, Fair Oaks, Seven Pines, Savage's Station, Glendale, Malvern Hill, Antietam, Fredericksburg (all of which took place in 1862), and Mine Run which lasted from November 1863 until December 1863.

From June 25 to July 1, 1862, during the Seven Days Battles, he was acting Adjutant General of General Sumner's Corps. Following the battles, Sumner recommended him for brevet Captain and brevet Major to the War Department for gallantry, however, the Senate failed to act on any recommendations from General George B. McClellan's campaign.

After the death of General Sumner in March 1863, Kip went to work on the staff of General John E. Wool and was assigned to the Headquarters of the Department of the East, as Assistant Inspector General of the Artillery. Six months later, he again joined the Army of the Potomac and was assigned to the staff of Brevet Major General Robert O. Tyler, as Inspector of the Artillery Reserve, taking part in the Battle of Rappahanock Station.

He was later appointed aide-de-camp on the staff of Major General Philip Sheridan where he fought in the Battles of Trevilian Station in 1864, where he was wounded, Cedar Creek, where he was slightly wounded again in 1864. On June 11, 1864, he was brevetted Captain "for gallant and meritorious service at the battle of Trevillian Station, Va."

In 1865, he was part of the Battles of Dinwiddie Court House, Five Forks, High Bridge, Sailor's Creek, Appomattox Station, and Appomattox Court House, where Confederate General Robert E. Lee surrendered. On March 31, 1865, he was brevetted Major "for gallant and meritorious service in the Cavalry campaign from Winchester to Petersburg and at the battle of Dinwiddie Court House, Va." and on April 1, 1865, he was brevetted Lieutenant Colonel "for gallant and meritorious service at the battle of Five Forks, Va."

Kip resigned from the Military in 1867.

=== Society life ===
In 1892, Kip and his wife Eva were included in Ward McAllister's "Four Hundred", purported to be an index of New York's best families, published in The New York Times. Conveniently, 400 was the number of people that could fit into Mrs. Astor's ballroom.

Kip, who was deeply interested in horse breeding and racing, served as president of the Coney Island Jockey Club, the first turf racecourse in the United States, president of the Suburban Riding and Driving Club, and vice-president of the National Show Horse Association. He was also a member of the Union Club of the City of New York, the Metropolitan Club, and the Tuxedo Club.

== Personal life ==
On April 23, 1867, Kip was married to Eva Lorillard (1847–1903), the daughter of Lorillard Tobacco Company heir Pierre Lorillard III.

Her grandfather, Pierre Lorillard II, was a tobacco manufacturer and real estate tycoon, for whom the term "millionaire" was first used in America for his father's obituary in 1843. Eva was the sister of Pierre Lorillard IV; Catherine Lorillard Kernochan, who married James Powell Kernochan; Jacob Lorillard; Mary Lorillard Barbey; George Lyndes Lorillard; and Louis Lasher Lorillard, who married Katherine Livingston Beeckman, sister of Governor Robert Livingston Beeckman.

Together, Eva and Lawrence were the parents of:

- Eva Maria Kip (1868–1870), who died young.
- Edith Kip (c. 1872 – 1949), who married Richard Stephen McCreery (1866–1938), son of Andrew McCreery, on April 18, 1894. they divorced in 1904, and she remarried to the Hon. Henry Thomas Coventry (1868–1934), son of George Coventry, 9th Earl of Coventry, on December 3, 1907. His brother, the Hon. Charles Coventry, was also married to an American, Lily Whitehouse, the sister of diplomat Sheldon Whitehouse.
- Lorillard Kip (1872–1896), who died unmarried of typhoid fever, aged 25.

Kip died on November 17, 1899, at his residence, 452 Fifth Avenue, in New York City after having been ill for nearly three weeks from "stomach trouble." His funeral was held Grace Church in New York and he was buried at Green-Wood Cemetery in Brooklyn, New York. In The New York Times write up of his funeral, it stated "There were society men, old and young; horsemen of more or less prominence, and roadhouse keepers. The number of women present was not especially large." After his death, his widow sold their Fifth Avenue home, took a camp in the Adirondaks, and died in poor health in 1903.

=== Descendants ===
Through his daughter Edith, he was the grandfather of four, including Lawrence B. McCreery and Lorillard Kip McCreery (d. 1926) from her first marriage, and Victor Henry Coventry (1909–1986), named after Henry's brother-in-law, Prince Victor Duleep Singh, and Cecil George Coventry (1911–1912), who died young, from her second marriage.

== Published works ==
- Army Life on the Pacific; A Journal of the Expedition Against the Northern Indians, the Tribes of the Coeur dÁlenes, Spokans, and Pelouzes, in the Summer of 1858, Redfield, Bedford, Massachusetts, (1859).
