= William Ingraham Kip =

American Protestant Episcopal bishop (1811-1893)

The Right Reverend William Ingraham Kip
- Bishop of California
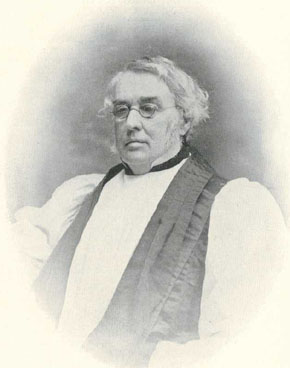
- Church: Episcopal Church
- Diocese: California
- Elected: February 5, 1857
- In office: 1857–1893
- Successor: William Ford Nichols
- Previous post: Missionary Bishop to California (1853–1856)

Orders
- Ordination: October 20, 1835 by George Washington Doane
- Consecration: October 28, 1853 by Jackson Kemper

Personal details
- Born: October 3, 1811 New York City, United States
- Died: April 7, 1893 (aged 81) San Francisco, California, United States
- Buried: Cypress Lawn Memorial Park
- Spouse: Maria Elizabeth Lawrence (m. 1835)
- Children: 2

William Ingraham Kip (October 3, 1811 – April 7, 1893) was an American Episcopal bishop.

== Early life ==
Kip was born in New York City, of Breton ancestry, the son of Leonard Kip and Maria (Ingraham) Kip. He graduated at Yale in 1831. After briefly studying law, Kip turned to a clerical calling and graduated from the General Theological Seminary in 1835. He was ordained deacon in June 1835 and ordained priest in October of the same year.

Kip became rector of St. Peter's Church in Morristown, New Jersey in 1835, moved to become assistant minister of Grace Church in New York City in 1836, and moved again to become rector of St. Paul's Episcopal Church in Albany, where he remained from 1838 to 1853.

== Episcopate ==
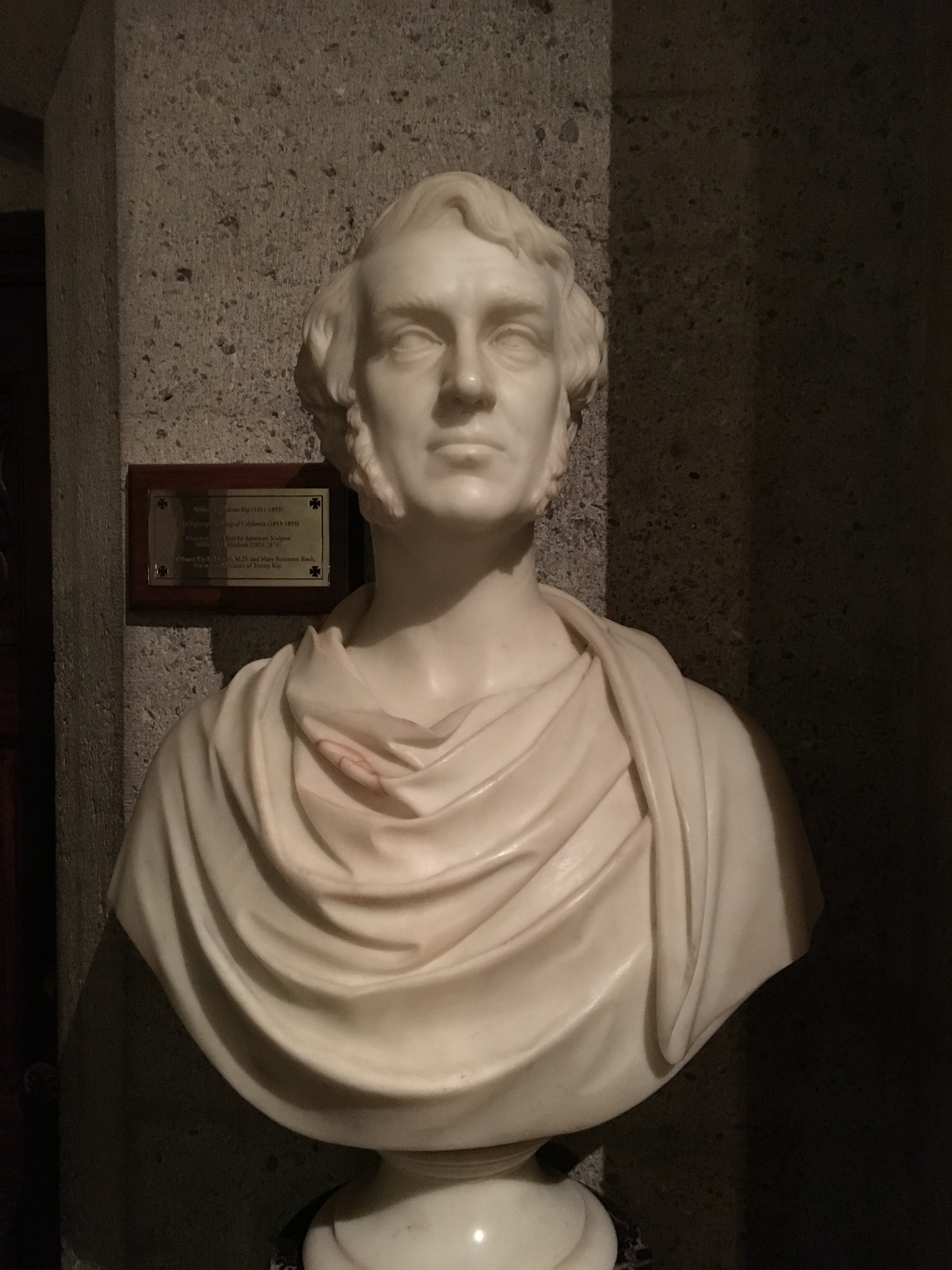
Bust of Kip by William Henry Rinehart

On October 28, 1853, Kip was chosen to be the missionary bishop to California. He was the 59th bishop in the ECUSA, and was consecrated by Bishops Jackson Kemper, Alfred Lee, and William Jones Boone. He arrived in California after a journey by steamship and transit of the Panamanian isthmus, which in those days could be a dangerous journey. Kip's brother, Leonard, had already moved to California during the Gold Rush, but returned to New York by the time Kip arrived in San Francisco. On arriving in San Francisco, Kip had only two congregations under his charge, but the Episcopal population soon began to grow as immigrants from the East streamed into California. When California became a diocese in its own right in 1856, Kip was elected as its first bishop. He continued to serve as Bishop of California until his death in 1893. His last act in office was the ordination of his grandson, William Ingraham Kip, III. Kip was noted for his Episcopalian Catholicism, which he considered as a means of raising the spiritual sights of California's urban centers. He also promoted the idea of "Grace Cathedral" for San Francisco, which was also advanced by his successor, William F. Nichols.

Among his works are:

- The Lenten Fast (1843)
- Early Jesuit Missions in North America (1846)
- The Catacombs of Rome (1854)
- The Olden Time in New York (1872)
- The Church and the Apostles (1877)
- Double Witness of the Church (twenty-second edition, 1904)

== Personal life ==
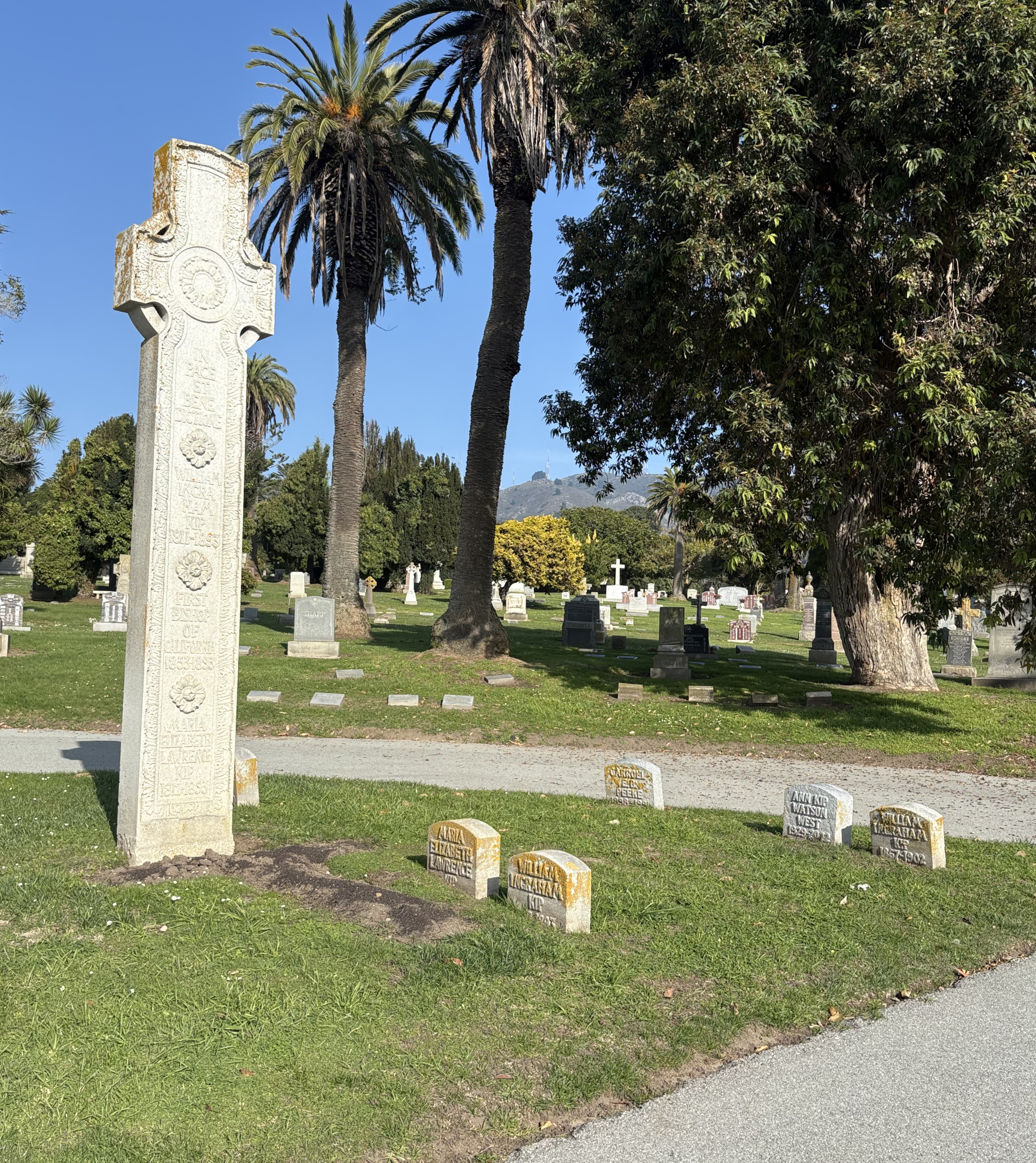
Kip's grave at Cypress Lawn Memorial Park

Kip was married to Maria Elizabeth Lawrence, the daughter of merchant banker Isaac Lawrence and Cornelia Beach (the daughter of a minister of Trinity Church). They had two children:

- Lawrence Kip (1836–1899), U.S. Army officer who married Eva Lorillard (1847–1903), the daughter of Lorillard Tobacco Company heir Pierre Lorillard III.
- William Ingraham Kip Jr. (1840–1902), the rector of Good Samaritan Missions in San Francisco. He married Elizabeth Clementine Kinney, the daughter of the U.S. Ambassador to Italy, William Burnet Kinney. They had four children, three of whom survived to adulthood: Elizabeth Clementine Kip (married Guy L. Eddie of the U.S. Army); Lawrence Kip; and Mary Burnet Kip (married to Dr. Ernest Franklin Robertson of Kansas City, KS).

His great-great-grandsons are businesspeople Frederick R. Koch, Charles Koch, David Koch, and Bill Koch.

William Ingraham Kip died in San Francisco on April 7, 1893, and was buried at Cypress Lawn Memorial Park in Colma.
