= Charlotte Chatton =

English actress

- Born: 1975 (age 50–51); Hammersmith, London, England
- Occupations: Film actress, television actress, screen writer
- Years active: 1986–2001 (as actress)

Charlotte Chatton (born 1975) is an English actress and screenwriter. She is perhaps most widely known for portraying Madeleine Astor in Titanic (1997) and for guest starring in a number of television series from the late 1980s until 2001, when she decided to retire from acting.

Chatton has been working in recent years as a producer and scriptwriter, and, in 2009, founded The Next Level Script, a professional screenwriting service. She is also the principal developer under the Westmount Pictures production team.

Her father is keyboardist Brian Chatton.

== Filmography ==
=== Film ===
Year	Title	Role	Notes
1991	A Small Dance	Leeanne	
1992	Dakota Road	Jen Cross	
1996	Hellraiser IV: Bloodline	Genevieve L'Merchant	
1997	Annie's Garden	Annie Thomas	
1997	Stand-ins	Peggy	
1997	Titanic	Madeleine Astor	
2001	Exploding Oedipus	Susan	
2020	Women of the White Buffalo	Writer, with Deborah Anderson	

=== Television ===
Year	Title	Role	Notes
1986	Dramarama	Elaine	Episode: "Flashback"
1992	Inspector Morse	Marilyn Garrett	Episode: "Cherubim & Seraphim"
1993	The Chief	Frankie	Episode: "3.5"
1994	Good King Wenceslas	Princess Johanna	TV film
1995	The Show Formerly Known as the Martin Short Show	Whitney Gallo / Britney Pierce	TV film
1996	Dr. Quinn, Medicine Woman	Emma	Recurring role (11 episodes)
1998	Beyond Belief: Fact or Fiction	Beverly	Episode: "The Gift"
