= Madeleine Astor =

American socialite and Titanic survivor (1893–1940)

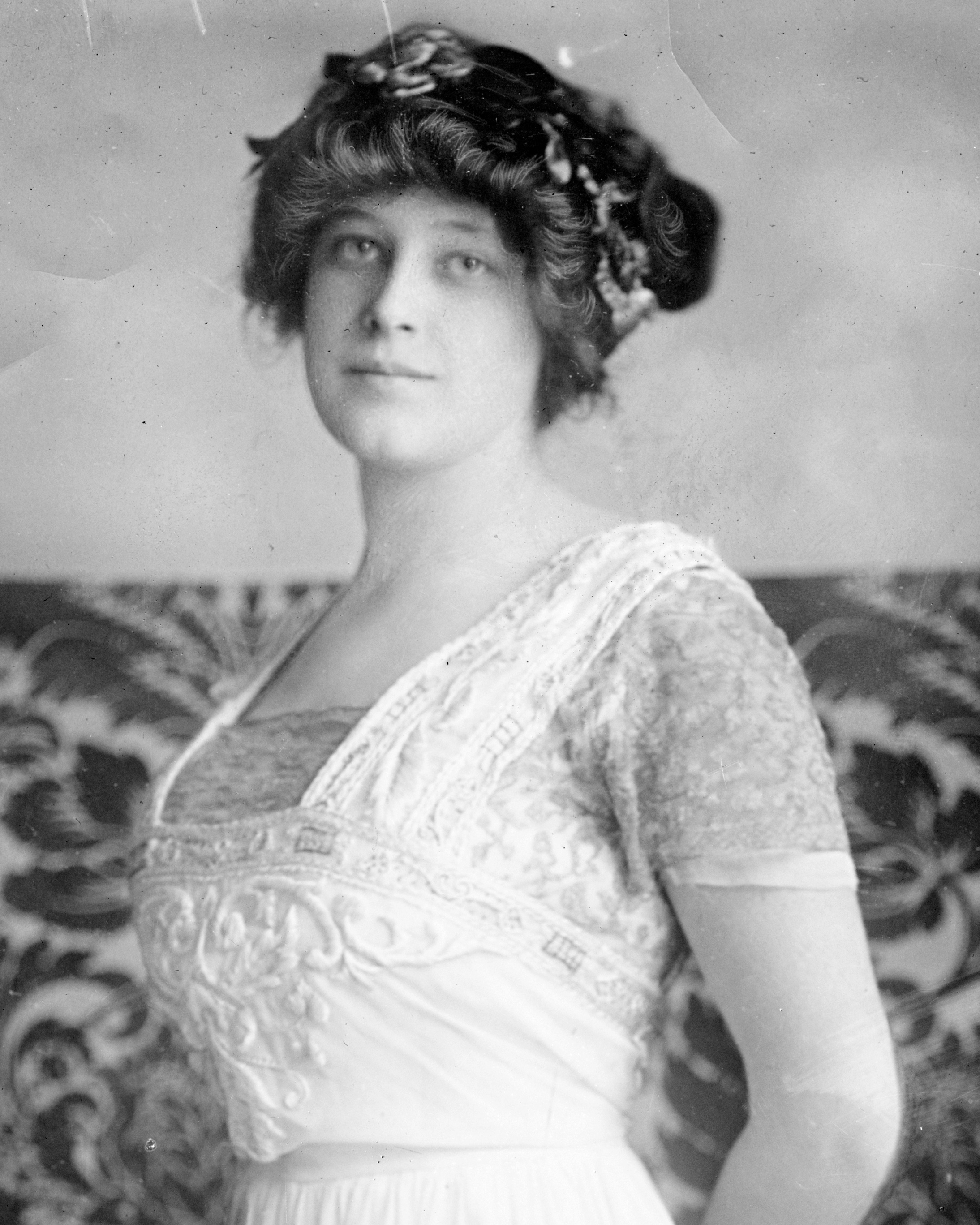
- Astor, c. 1910
- Born: Madeleine Talmage Force; June 19, 1893; New York City, U.S.
- Died: March 27, 1940 (aged 46); Palm Beach, Florida, U.S.
- Burial place: Trinity Church Cemetery
- Education: Miss Ely's School; Miss Spence's School
- Spouses: John Jacob Astor IV (m. 1911; died 1912) William Karl Dick (m. 1916; div. 1933) Enzo Fiermonte (m. 1933; div. 1938)
- Children: John Jacob Astor VI; William Force Dick; John Henry Dick
- Relatives: Katherine Emmons Force (sister); Tunis V. P. Talmage (grandfather)

Madeleine Talmage Astor (née Force; June 19, 1893 – March 27, 1940) was an American socialite. She was known for being a survivor of the sinking of the RMS Titanic and for her first marriage to John Jacob Astor IV, which resulted in a society scandal because of a 29-year age gap.

== Early life ==
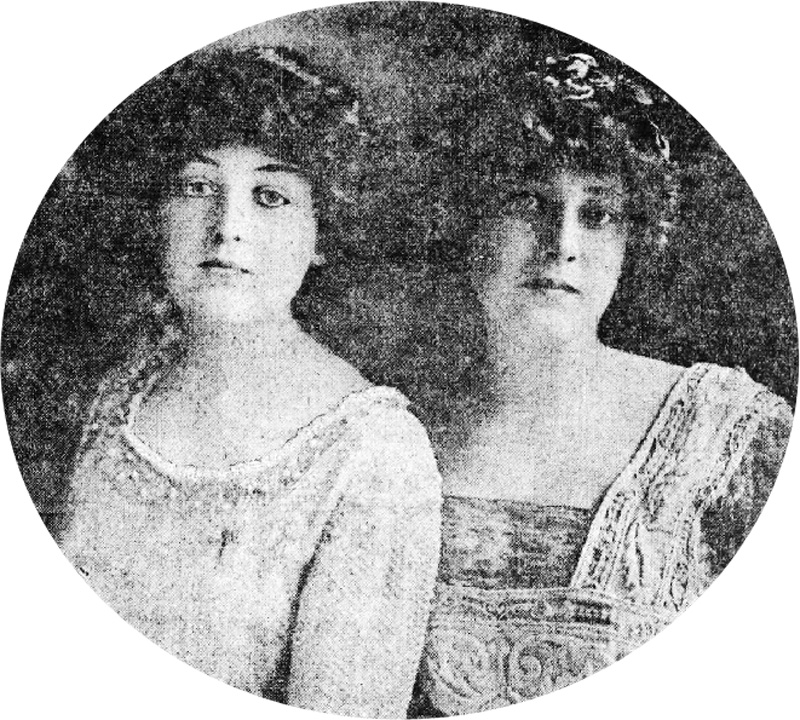
Katherine (left) and Madeleine Force.

Madeleine Talmage Force was born on June 19, 1893, in Brooklyn, New York, the younger daughter of William Hurlbut Force (1852–1917) and Katherine Arvilla Talmage (1863–1930). Madeleine's elder sister Katherine Emmons Force was a real estate businesswoman and socialite. Through their father, both sisters had French ancestry and were grand-nieces of builder Ephraim S. Force (1822 – March 12, 1914). Their mother had Dutch ancestry.

William Force was a member of a well-established business family. He owned the successful shipping firm William H. Force and Co., and his father had been prosperous in the manufacturing industry.

In 1889, Force married Katherine Talmage, the granddaughter of former Brooklyn mayor Thomas Talmage. The Forces were part of Brooklyn high society, while William Force was a member of numerous prestigious clubs in the city. He also owned an art collection. Like the Astor family, the Forces were members of the Episcopal Church. Madeleine's maternal grandfather was New York State Assemblyman Tunis V. P. Talmage and her great-grandfather, Thomas G. Talmage, was Mayor of Brooklyn. She was also distantly related to Colonel Benjamin Tallmadge, who served under George Washington in the American Revolutionary War.

Madeleine was educated at Miss Ely's School and then for four years at Miss Spence's School, on West 48th Street in Manhattan. According to one report, she was "counted an especially brilliant pupil" at this school. She and her sister were also taken abroad by their mother and toured Europe several times. When she was introduced to New York social life, she was immediately adopted by the Junior League, a clique of debutantes. She appeared in several New York society plays and attracted quite a following. She was known to be a very competent horsewoman and enjoyed yachting. One report said she was bright and good with drawing-room conversation.

== Courtship and first marriage ==
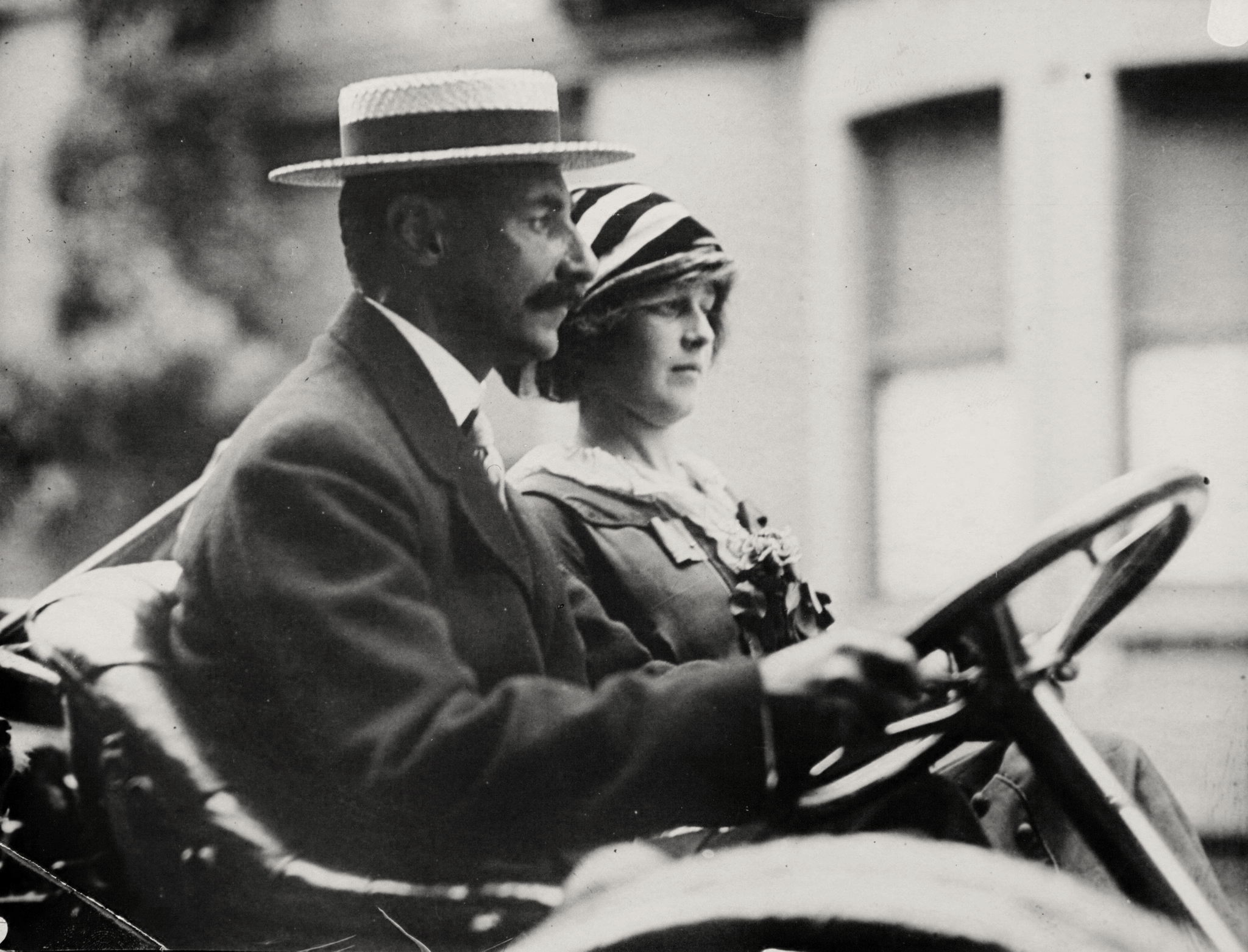
Madeleine with Colonel Astor.

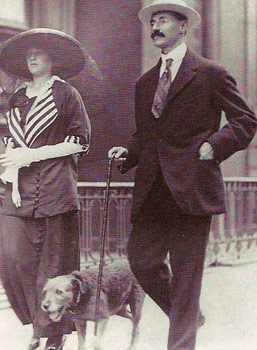
Madeleine with John and their Airedale, Kitty.

Madeleine met Colonel John Jacob "Jack" Astor IV, the only son of businessman William Backhouse Astor, Jr. and socialite Caroline Webster "Lina" Schermerhorn. During their courtship, he took her on automobile drives and yacht trips, and they were often followed by the press. They became engaged in August 1911 and were married on September 9, 1911. There was a considerable amount of opposition to the marriage, not only because of their age difference (29 years apart, with Madeleine being 18 and John being 47) but also because of his recent divorce (November 1909) from his previous wife.

After several Episcopalian priests refused to celebrate the nuptials, the couple was eventually married by a Congregationalist minister in Beechwood, his Newport mansion. His son William Vincent Astor served as best man.

After their marriage, they had an extended honeymoon. They visited several places locally first, then in January 1912, they sailed from New York on the Olympic, and enjoyed a long Egyptian tour. While returning from this part of their honeymoon, they booked their passage on the Titanic.

== Aboard the Titanic ==
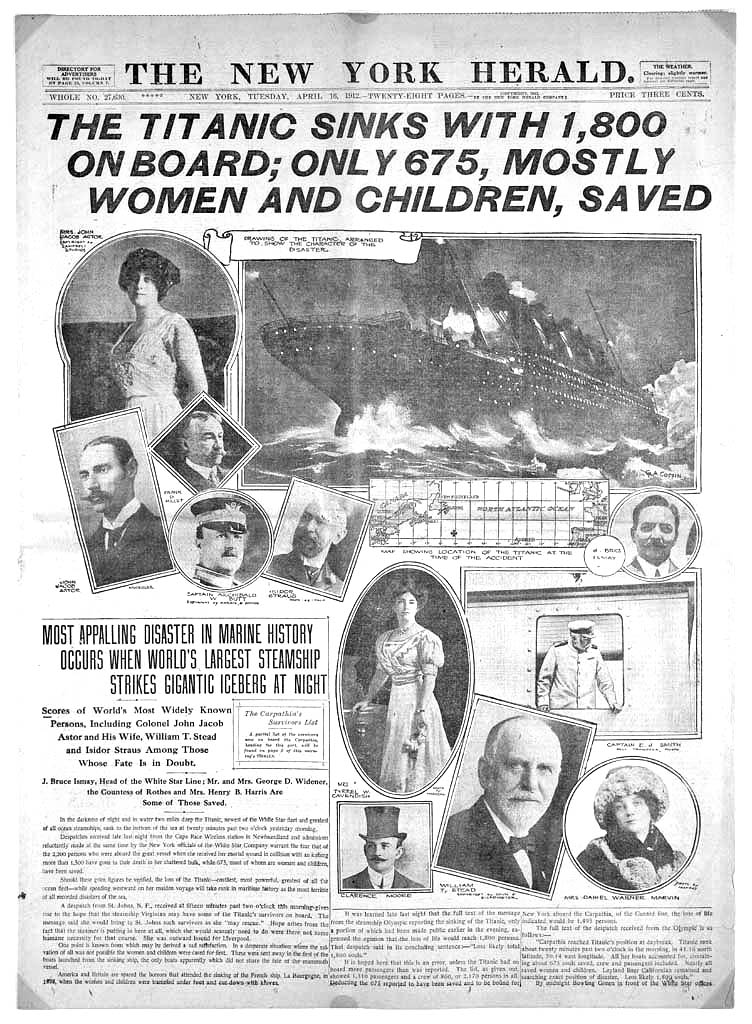
Newspaper report of the sinking of the Titanic. Most reports featured the Astors in the headlines.

Madeleine Astor, then five months pregnant, boarded the Titanic as a first-class passenger in Cherbourg, France, with her husband; her husband's valet, Victor Robbins; her maid, Rosalie Bidois; and her nurse, Caroline Endres. They also took Kitty, Colonel Astor's pet Airedale, and occupied one of the parlour suites. On the night of April 14, 1912, Colonel Astor reported to his wife that the ship had hit an iceberg. He reassured her that the damage did not appear serious, though he helped her strap on her life jacket. While they were waiting on the boat-deck, Mrs. Astor lent Leah Aks, a third-class passenger, her fur shawl to keep her son, Filly, warm. At one point, the Astors retired to the gymnasium and sat on the mechanical horses in their life jackets. Colonel Astor found another life jacket which he reportedly cut with a pen knife to show Mrs. Astor what it was made of. When it was time to board a lifeboat, Mrs. Astor, her maid, and her nurse had to crawl through the first-class promenade window into the tilting lifeboat 4, which had been lowered down to A deck to take on more passengers. Colonel Astor helped Mrs. Astor climb through the window and asked if he could accompany her as she was 'in a delicate condition'. The request was denied by Second Officer Charles Lightoller. An account of Madeleine Astor's boarding of the lifeboat was given by Archibald Gracie IV to the U.S. Senate Titanic inquiry. Gracie was a fellow passenger and recalled the events regarding Mrs. Astor in the following terms.

The only incident I remember in particular at this point is when Mrs Astor was put in the boat. She was lifted up through the window, and her husband helped her on the other side, and when she got in, her husband was on one side of this window and I was on the other side, at the next window. I heard Mr Astor ask the second officer whether he would not be allowed to go aboard this boat to protect his wife. He said, 'No, sir, no man is allowed on this boat or any of the boats until the ladies are off.' Mr Astor then said, 'Well, tell me what is the number of this boat so I may find her afterwards,' or words to that effect. The answer came back, 'No. 4.'

Colonel Astor and his valet died in the sinking; the former's body was recovered on April 22. He was found to be carrying about $2,500 in cash, brought with him from his cabin. His young widow and the other survivors were rescued by the RMS Carpathia around 03:30.

Madeleine Astor gave an account of what she recalled almost immediately after her arrival home through her spokesman Nicholas Biddle, who was a trustee of the Astor estate. The account given by her spokesman is:

On landing from the Carpathia, the young bride widowed by the Titanic's sinking told members of her family what she could recall of the circumstances of the disaster. Of how Colonel Astor had met his death she had no definite conception.

She recalled she thought that in the confusion as she was about to be put into one of the boats Colonel Astor was standing by her side. After that she had no very clear recollection of the happenings until the boats were well clear of the sinking steamer.

Mrs Astor, it appears, left in one of the last boats which got away from the ship. It was her belief that all the women who wished to go had then been taken off. Her impression was that the boat she left in had room for at least 15 more persons. The men, for some reason (that) she could not and does not now understand, did not seem to be at all anxious to leave the ship. Almost everyone seemed dazed.

== Widowhood ==
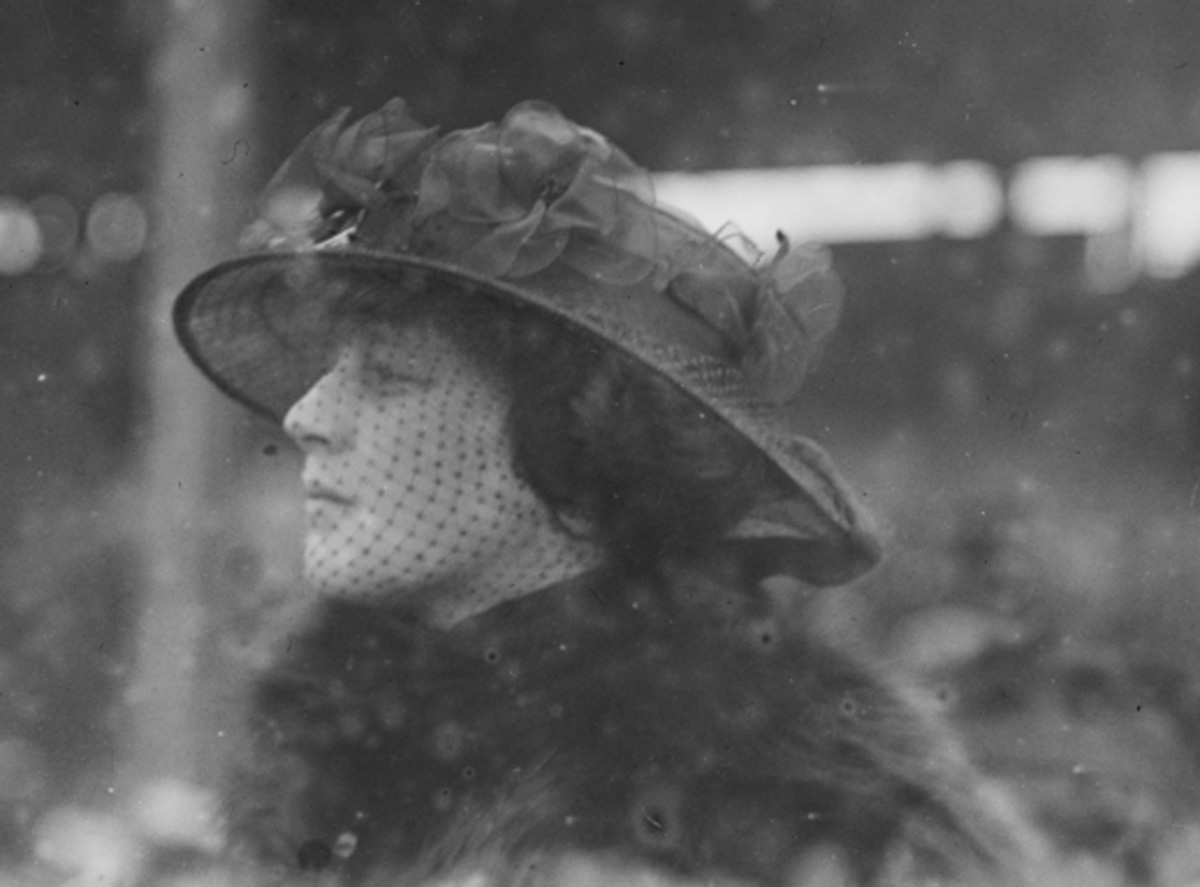
Astor at Belmont Park, 1915.

After Astor returned home from her ordeal, she was kept in strict retirement. Her first social function was not until the end of May, when she held a luncheon at her mansion on Fifth Avenue for Arthur Rostron, the captain of the Carpathia, and Dr. Frank McGee, the ship's surgeon. She held this event with Marian Thayer, also a survivor of the Titanic. Both wished to thank these men for their assistance when they were aboard the Carpathia.

In his will, John Jacob Astor IV left his wife an outright sum of $100,000, the income from a trust fund of $5 million, and the use of the house on Fifth Avenue. Both of the latter provisions she would lose if she remarried. A fund of $3 million was set aside for his unborn child John Jacob "Jakey" Astor VI, which he would control when he became of age. On August 14, 1912, Astor gave birth to Jakey at her Fifth Avenue mansion. For the next four years, she raised him as part of the Astor family. She did not appear very often in society until the end of 1913, when according to the press, they published her first photograph since the Titanic disaster.

After this, she appeared more often in public and her activities were frequently reported in the press. In 1915, she remodeled her house on Fifth Avenue and this was made a feature article in the The Sun. Many articles about her eldest son were also published.

== Remarriages ==
On June 22, 1916, four years after Colonel Astor's death, Astor married her childhood friend, banker William Karl Dick (May 28, 1888 – September 5, 1953), in Bar Harbor, Maine; they honeymooned in California. He was a vice-president of the Manufacturers Trust Company of New York and a part owner and director of the Brooklyn Times. As stated in Colonel Astor's will, she lost her stipend from his trust fund. They had two sons:

- William Force Dick (April 11, 1917 – December 4, 1961)
- John Henry Dick (May 12, 1919 – September 18, 1995) ornithologist, photographer, naturalist, conservationist, author, painter, and bird illustrator

They divorced on July 21, 1933, in Reno, Nevada. Four months later, on November 27, 1933, Astor married Italian actor/boxer Enzo Fiermonte in a civil ceremony in New York City. They honeymooned in Palm Beach, Florida, and eventually moved there. They had no children together and divorced on June 11, 1938, in West Palm Beach, Florida.

== Death ==
Astor died of a heart ailment at her mansion in Palm Beach on March 27, 1940, at the age of 46, and was buried in Trinity Church Cemetery in New York City, in a mausoleum with her mother.

== In popular culture ==
=== Film and TV ===
- Charlotte Thiele (Titanic, 1943)
- Frances Bergen (Titanic, 1953)
- Mary Shipp (1955) (You Are There: The Sinking of the Titanic (TV episode, 22 May 1955)
- Millette Alexander (Kraft Television Theatre; A Night to Remember, 1956 TV series)
- Beverly Ross (S.O.S. Titanic, 1979 TV movie)
- Janne Mortil (Titanic, 1996 miniseries)
- Charlotte Chatton (Titanic, 1997)
- Piper Gunnarson (Ghosts of the Abyss, 2003 documentary)
- Angéla Eke (Titanic, 2012 miniseries)
- Heather-Alexa Ross (Titanic: The Aftermath, 2012 documentary)

=== Books and literature ===
- The Second Mrs. Astor, by Shana Abé (2021)
- The Deep by Alma Katsu (2020)
