= Vinland Estate =

Building in Newport, Rhode Island, US

Coordinates: 41°28′20.2″N 71°17′56.0″W

Vinland Estate

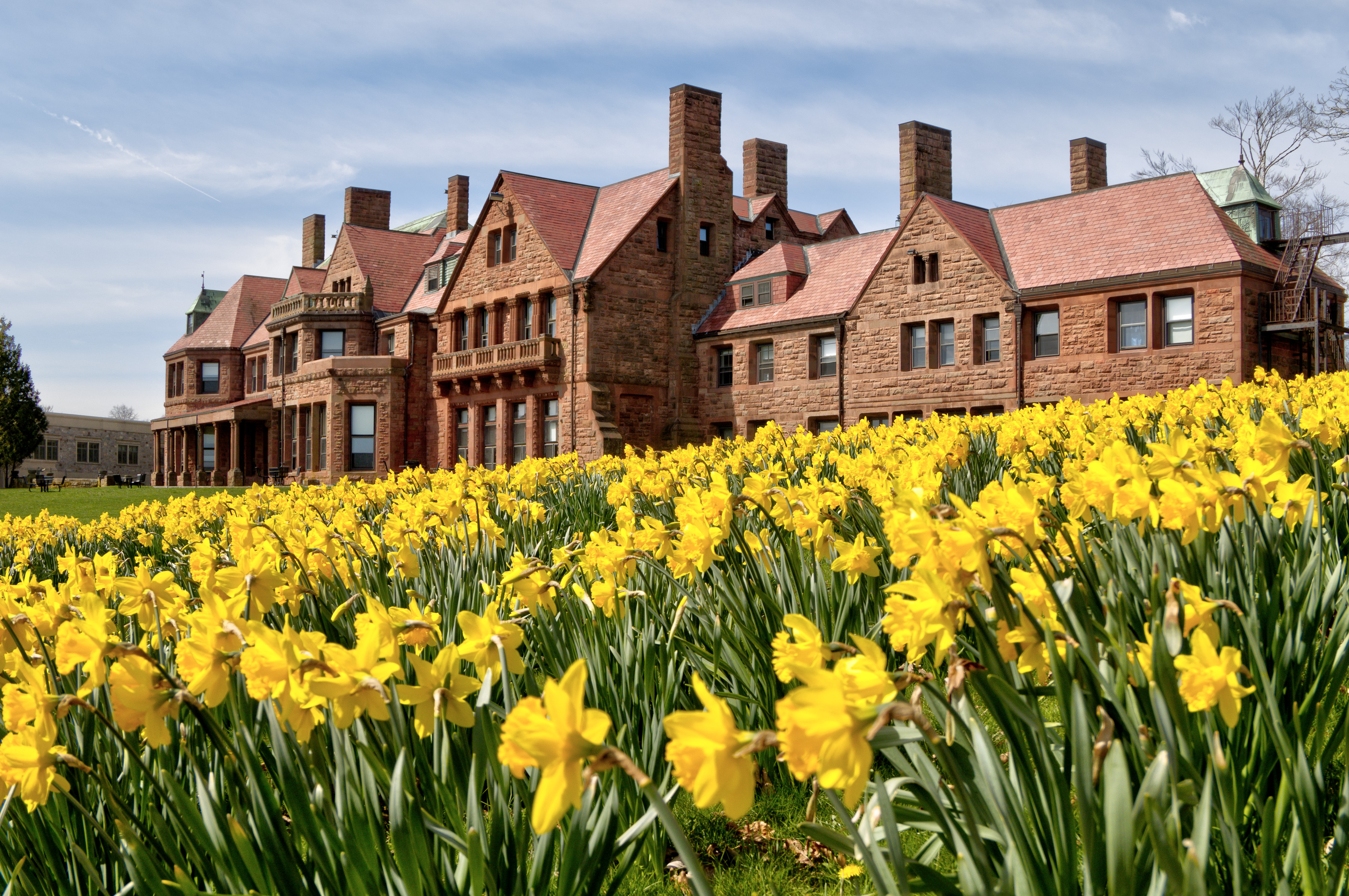
McAuley Hall, the main house

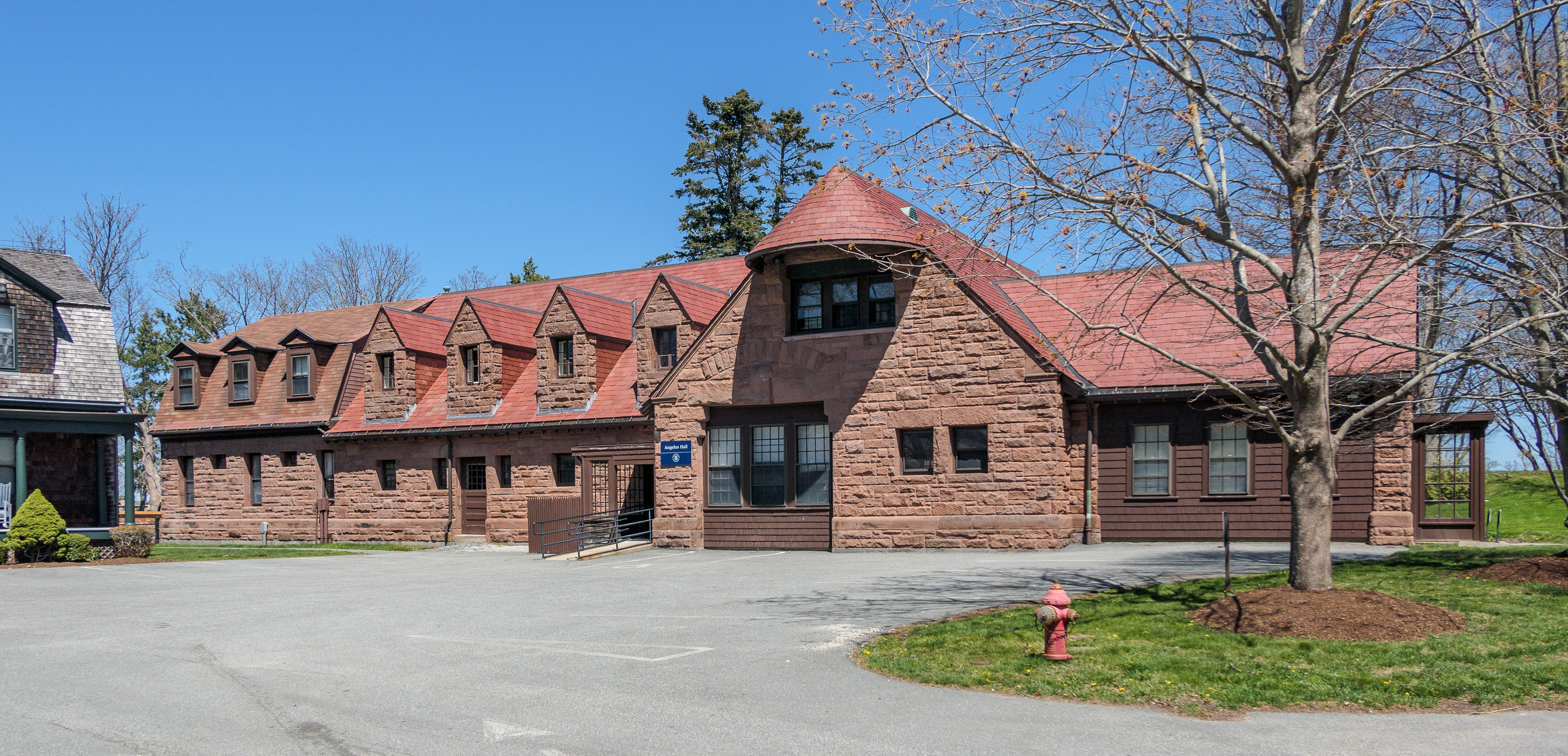
Angelus Hall, carriage house

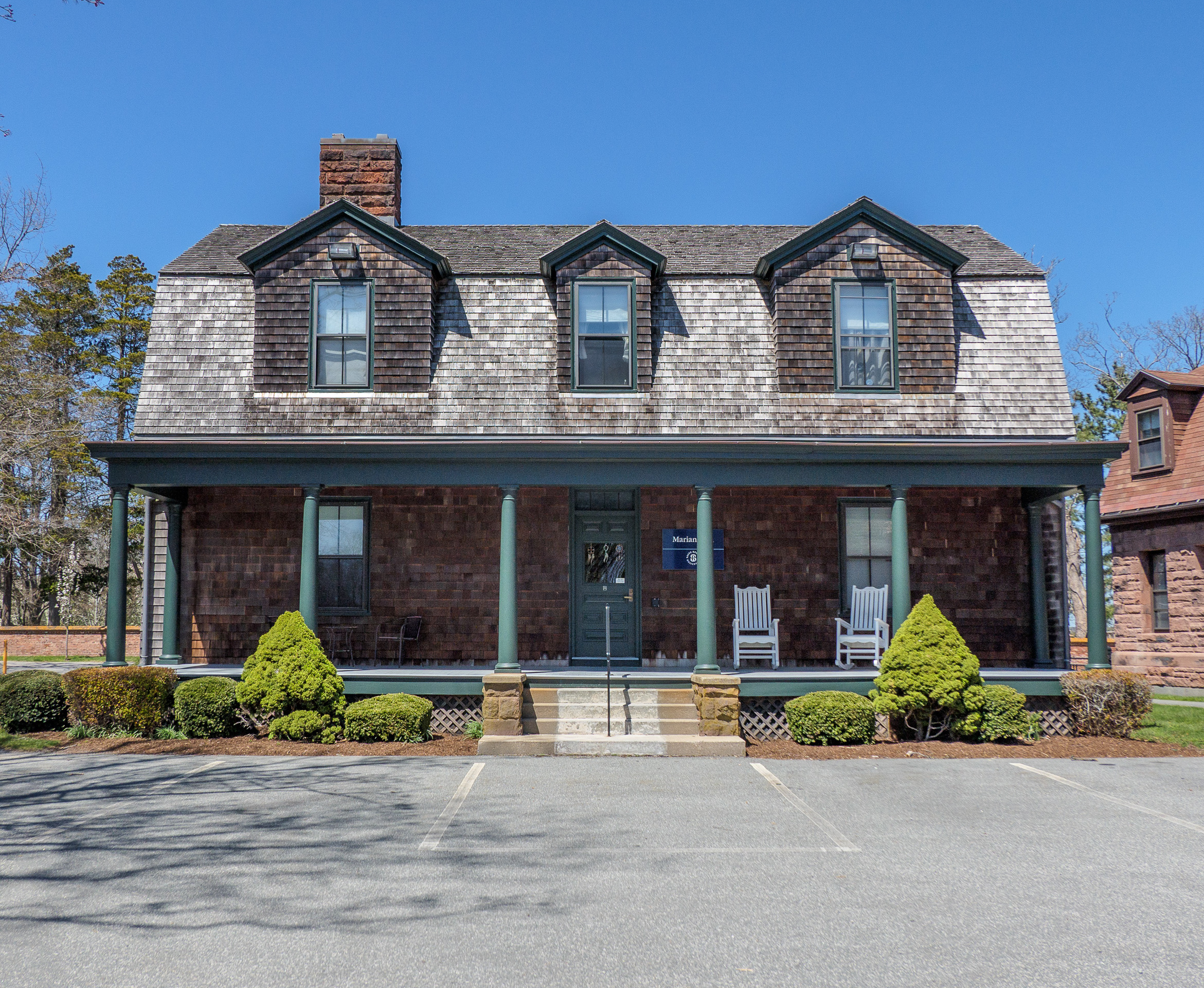
Marian Hall, caretaker's cottage

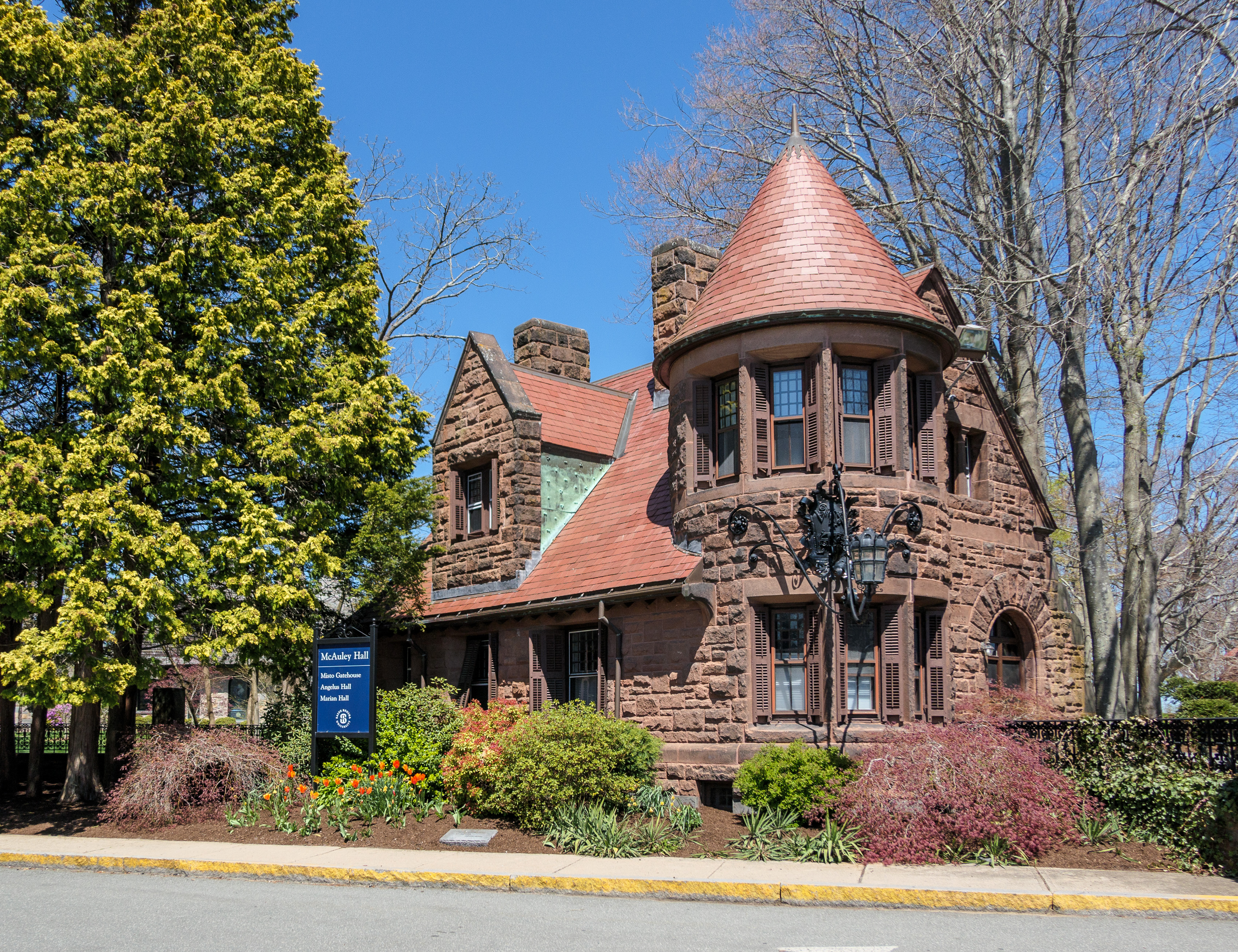
The Gatehouse, gardener's residence

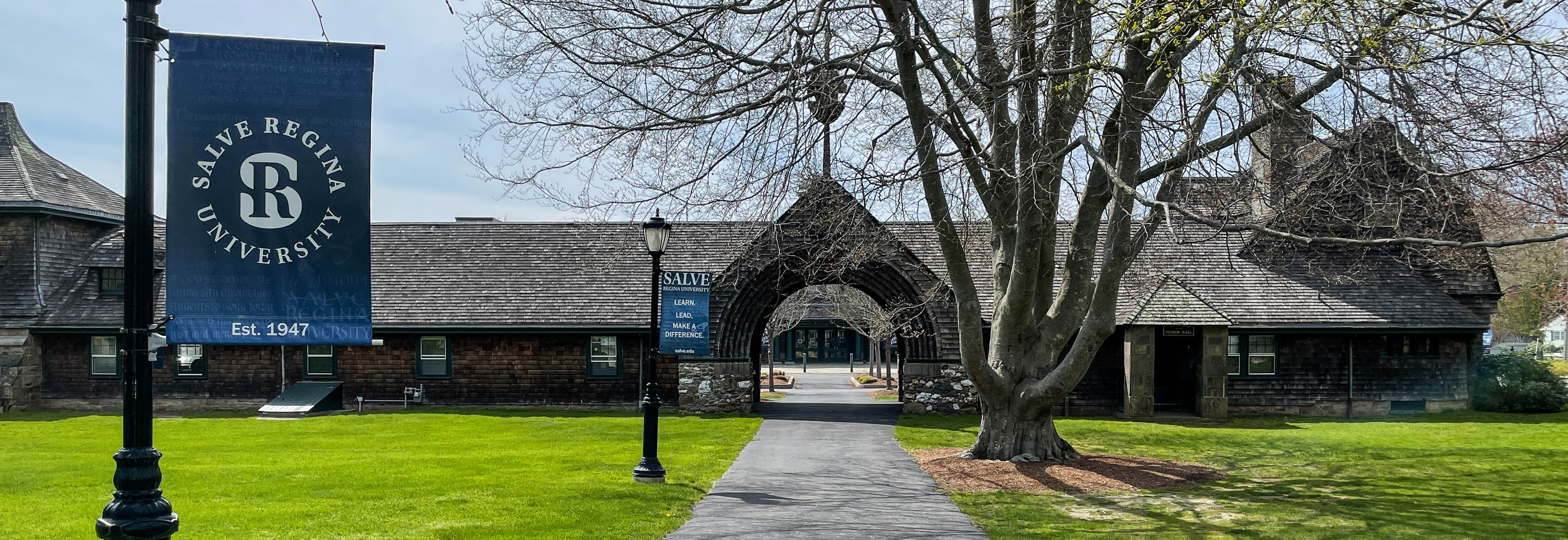
Stonor and Drexel Halls, hennery and cottage connected by an archway

Vinland Estate was built at Ochre Point, Newport, Rhode Island, United States, in 1882 for tobacco heiress Catharine Lorillard Wolfe by Peabody & Stearns. The Romanesque Revival style exterior consists of red sandstone with Aesthetic Movement style elements. Interior elements include designs by William Morris, windows by Burne-Jones, and landscaping by Ernest Bowditch.

== History ==
Ms Wolfe is reported to have had the home built, inspired by Henry Wadsworth Longfellow's poem "The Skeleton in Armor". It is named after the first spot on which the old Norsemen are supposed to have landed on their historic voyage across the ocean. It was built with theme of a Viking settlement and includes a Roman Dolium by the entrance. The exterior features window casing carvings of fruit and vines.

In 1896, Vinland was sold to railroad tycoon Hamilton McKown Twombly and his wife Florence Adele Vanderbilt Twombly. The Twomblys enlarged the house considerably between 1907 and 1910. The interior at this time was recreated by Ogden Codman. In 1955, Mrs. Twombly's daughter, Florence Burden, donated the estate to Salve Regina University.

There are several buildings now owned by Salve Regina University, which make up the former Vinland estate:

- McAuley Hall (1883, Peabody & Stearns) was the estate's main building, and served as the university's library for many years and now houses classrooms and offices
- Angelus Hall (1882, Peabody & Stearns) served as the carriage house and housing for the butlers and footmen.
- Tobin Hall (1884, Peabody & Stearns)
- Stonor and Drexel Halls (Peabody & Stearns), hennery and cottage separated by a Romanesque archway
- Misto Gatehouse (late 1800s, Peabody & Stearns), the gardener's residence
- Marian Hall (built "later") is the former caretaker's cottage
