= Leonard Kip =

American novelist

Leonard Kip (1826–1906) was a scion of Old New York who joined the gold rush to California for a year of adventure before returning to his home state for a long career in law and literature. However, he continued to contribute to the California-based magazine Overland Monthly until 1894.

== Life and work ==
Kip, born September 13, 1826, descended from prosperous and distinguished Hudson River valley Dutch and Huguenot landowners who had settled in the New Amsterdam colony in the early 17th century. He attended Trinity College in Connecticut from 1842 to 46, studied law after receiving his B.A. and was preparing to commence a legal career when news of the mining bonanza at Sutter's Mill excited his curiosity and ambition. He became one of the fabled Forty-Niners, making the long voyage round Cape Horn to California. The rawness of San Francisco intrigued him without pleasing him. He saw it as “running wild after amusement” and seeking wealth in an “unnatural excitement which could not last”. After several months in mining country near Stockton, Kip left California predicting the collapse not only of gold fever but of any significant future the state due to “a climate presenting the most insufferable extremes of heat and cold,” worthless soil, scarcity of water, and the growing threat of cholera in what was already a “stronghold of dysentery”. He returned east, settled into legal work in Albany, and married, in 1852, Harriet L. Van Rensselaer, daughter of Gen. John Sanders Van Rensselaer and member of an even more prominent New York family than his own. In 1850, he published his first book, the California Sketches that recount his skeptical observations of the Gold Rush. Other books and articles followed, including ten novels, most of them tales of mystery or the supernatural. In 1855, he was elected president of the Albany Institute of Art and History, a position he filled for ten years. Kip died February 15, 1906.

Although Leonard Kip quickly wearied of California, his brother the Rt. Rev. William Ingraham Kip (1811–93) followed in 1853 and remained until his death forty years later, a major figure in the state's development as the first Protestant Episcopal Bishop of California and a noted religious writer and church historian.

== Other publications ==
Besides contributing to periodicals, he published:

- California Sketches (1850)
- Volcano Diggings (1851)
- Ænone (1866)
- The Dead Marquise (1873)
- Hannibal's Man and Other Tales (1878)
- Under the Bells (1879)
- Nestlenook (1880)
