= John Henry Dick =

American naturalist and bird artist

- Born: May 12, 1919; Brooklyn, New York, U.S.
- Died: September 18, 1995 (aged 76); Charleston, South Carolina, U.S.
- Education: Yale School of Art
- Parent(s): William Karl Dick; Madeleine Force Astor
- Relatives: John Jacob Astor VI (half-brother)

John Henry Dick (May 12, 1919 – September 18, 1995) was an American naturalist and wildlife artist who specialized in birds.

== Early life ==
Dick was born in at his parents' townhouse in Brooklyn, New York on May 12, 1919. His parents were William Karl Dick and Madeleine Talmage Force. Madeleine survived the RMS Titanic sinking where her first husband John Jacob Astor IV died, and had a posthumously born son named John Jacob Astor VI with him. Dick also had an elder full brother named William Force Dick.

He grew up in Manhattan and at the age of seven he shot a golden-crowned kinglet. He frequently visited the American Museum of Natural History where he met Frank Chapman, James Chapin, Robert Cushman Murphy and Roy Chapman Andrews. He was also able to observe Francis Lee Jaques work on paintings in the backgrounds of exhibits. His great-grandfather, William Dick, was an early investor in the National Sugar Refining Co., of which his father was a director. Dick went to Brooks School where his grades were poor but shortly before graduating in 1936, his headmaster Frank D. Ashburn had him paint a mural in the dining hall. He spent some time on Dixie Plantation in Charleston County near Meggett that his mother had come to own. Here, around 1937-38, he was tutored by John Moffett. He then studied at the Yale School of Art. His mother restored the home in Dixie Plantation, but it burned down in 1939 and his mother died shortly after. In 1941, he joined the United States Air Force during World War II, visiting the South Pacific Islands. When the war came to an end he was on Iwo Jima. After the war he went to live on Dixie Plantation where he built a house in 1947.

== Career ==
John Henry Dick illustrated numerous books on birds including South Carolina Bird Life (1949), Florida Birdlife (1954), The Warblers of America (1957), A Gathering of Shore Birds (1960), Carolina Lowcountry Impressions (1964), A pictorial guide to the birds of the Indian subcontinent (1983) and The Birds of China (1984). He also published an illustrated autobiographical book in 1979 titled Other Edens: The Sketchbook of an Artist Naturalist which won a national conservation award from the Garden Club of America in 1984.

The Dixie Plantation estate beside the Stono River had a variety of habitats on 900 acres where he encouraged birds. Apart from bird art, he also took an interest in photography and lectured at the Charleston Natural History Society and travelled around the world to observe birds.

== Personal life ==
Dick turned blind towards the end of his life and died on his estate which was then bequeathed to the College of Charleston.
