= Pierre Lorillard III =

American businessman

- Born: October 20, 1796
- Died: December 23, 1867 (aged 71); Saratoga, New York, U.S.
- Known for: Tuxedo Park, New York
- Spouse: Catherine Anne Griswold (died 1856)
- Children: 7, including Pierre, George
- Parent(s): Pierre Lorillard II; Maria Dorothea Schultz
- Relatives: Pierre Abraham Lorillard (grandfather); Catharine Lorillard Wolfe (niece)

Pierre Lorillard III (October 20, 1796 – October 6, 1867) was the grandson of Pierre Abraham Lorillard, the founder of P. Lorillard and Company. Heir to a great tobacco fortune, Lorillard owned no less than 600,000 acres (2,400 km^{2}) of undeveloped land in New York's Orange and Rockland counties, across the Hudson River and about an hour's train ride from the city. His son Pierre Lorillard IV developed Tuxedo Park on the family property in the 1880s.

== Early life ==
Pierre Lorillard III (born on October 20, 1796) was the son of Pierre Lorillard II (1764–1843) and Maria Dorothea Schultz (1770–1834). His father, a prominent tobacco manufacturer, industrialist, banker, businessman, and real estate tycoon, was one of the wealthiest Americans of his day and the first person described in American newspapers as a "millionaire," though not America's first millionaire. His grandfather, Pierre Abraham Lorillard (1742–1776), was the founder of the P. Lorillard and Company, which provided the family fortune.

Through his sister Dorothea Anne Lorillard (1798–1866), who married John David Wolfe (1792–1872), a real estate developer, Lorillard III was the uncle of philanthropist Catharine Lorillard Wolfe (1828–1887). Another sister, Eleanora Eliza Lorillard (1801–1843), was married to William Augustus Spencer (1792–1854), son of Ambrose Spencer and brother of John Canfield Spencer.

== Career ==
In 1866, Lorillard built the Italianate commercial building at 827 Broadway in New York City.

== Personal life ==
Lorillard was married to Catherine Anne Griswold (1809–1856). Her family owned "the great New York mercantile house of N. L. & G. Griswold, known to their rivals as "No Loss and Great Gain Griswold," importers of rum, sugar, and tea." Together they were the parents of:

- Pierre Lorillard IV (1833–1901), who married Emily Taylor (1841–1925), and owned the yacht Vesta.
- Catherine Lorillard (1835–1917), who married James Powell Kernochan (1831–1897)
- Jacob Lorillard (1839–1916), who married Frances Augusta Uhlhorn (1843–1896), daughter of C.F. Uhlhorn, Esq., in 1861. After her death, he married Gertrude Verplanck Uhlhorn (b. 1847), former wife of Wentworth Huyshe (1847–1934), an artist, and daughter of William C. Uhlhorn, in 1897.
- Mary Lorillard (1841–1926), who married Henry Isaac Barbey (1832–1906).
- George Lyndes Lorillard (1843–1886), who married Marie Louise La Farge (1845–1899), the former wife of Edward Whyte, whom she divorced. She was the sister of John La Farge, and later became Countess de Agreda after she married the Spanish-Mexican Count de Agreda. After his death in 1886, she married Francis Morse (son of Leopold Morse), who changed his name to Francis Morse de Agreda.
- Louis Lasher Lorillard (1849–1910), who married Katherine Livingston Beeckman (1855–1941), sister of Governor Robert Livingston Beeckman.
- Eva Lorillard (1847–1903), who married Lawrence Kip (1836–1899), son of William Ingraham Kip (1811–1893)

Lorillard died on October 6, 1867, in Saratoga, Florida.

=== Descendants ===
Through his daughter Mary, he was the grandfather of Hélène Barbey (1868–1945) who married Hermann Alexander, Graf von Pourtalès (1847–1904), who both competed in the 1900 Summer Olympics, with Hélène becoming the first woman to win a gold medal.
