= Mary Helen Carlisle =

British painter (1869–1925)

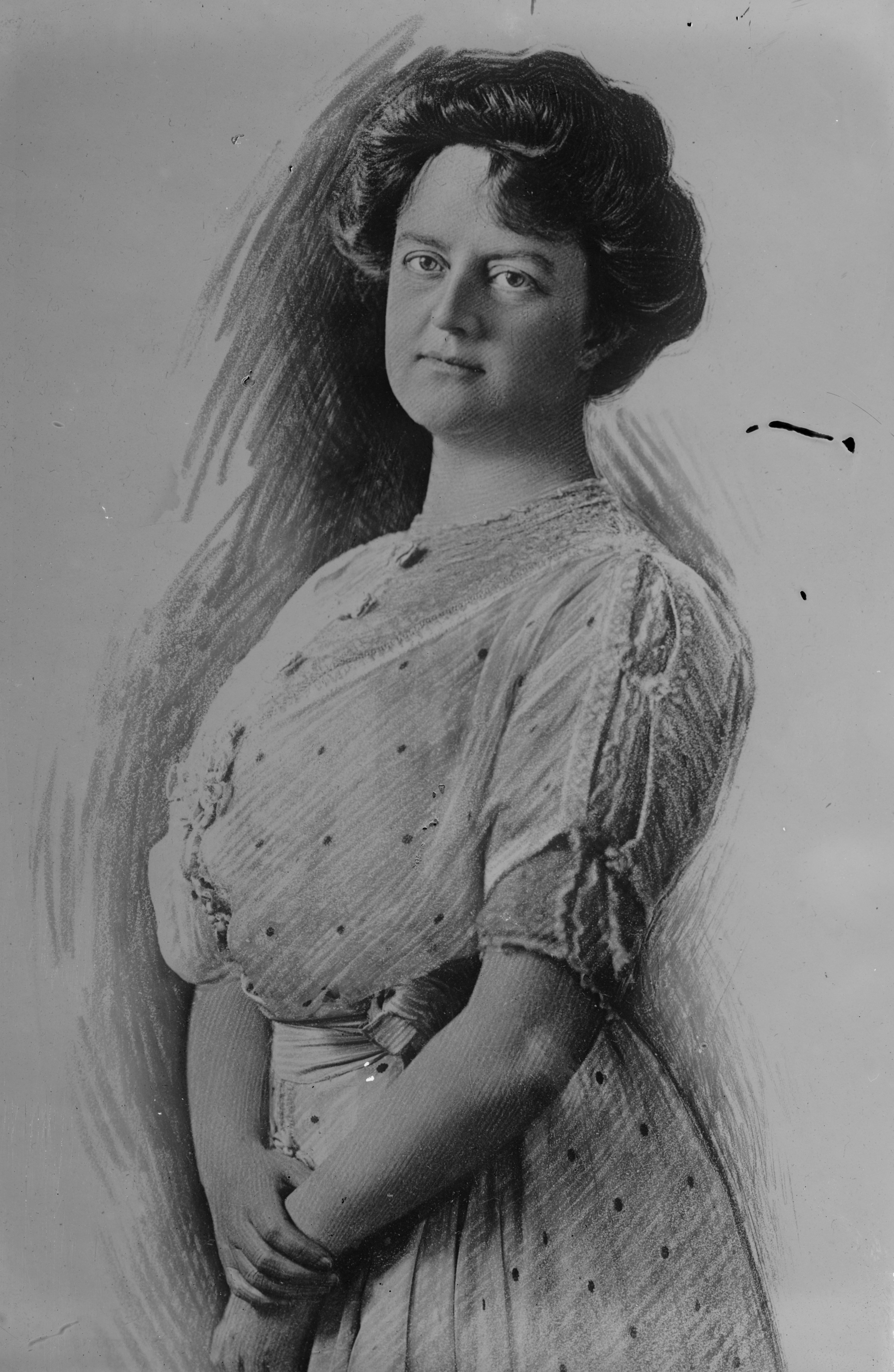
- Born: 20 November 1869; Grahamstown, South Africa
- Died: 17 March 1925 (aged 55)
- Education: Académie Julian
- Known for: Painting

Mary Helen Carlisle (1869 - 1925) was a British painter.

Carlisle was born in Grahamstown, Cape Colony, and went to school in England. Her first exhibition was at the Royal Academy in 1890, and she studied art in Paris between 1890 and 1895 at the Académie Julian under William-Adolphe Bouguereau, Tony Robert-Fleury, and Benjamin Jean-Joseph Constant. Her female contemporaries at the Academie included Rose-Marie Guillaume and Amelie Beaury-Saurel.

Having travelled in the United States of America she stayed in California between 1911 and 1915, then moved to New York.

Her work included working in pastels and oils, landscape painting, miniatures, and portraits. Carlisle's miniatures depicting Queen Victoria and Princess Mary are held in the National Portrait Gallery.

Carlisle was an internationally renowned artist who exhibited her works at the Royal Academy of Arts in London; the Paris Salon; Walker's Art Gallery, London; Charles Cobb Gallery, Boston; Knoedler & Co., New York; and Steckel Gallery, Los Angeles.
