= Catharine Lorillard Wolfe =

American philanthropist and art collector

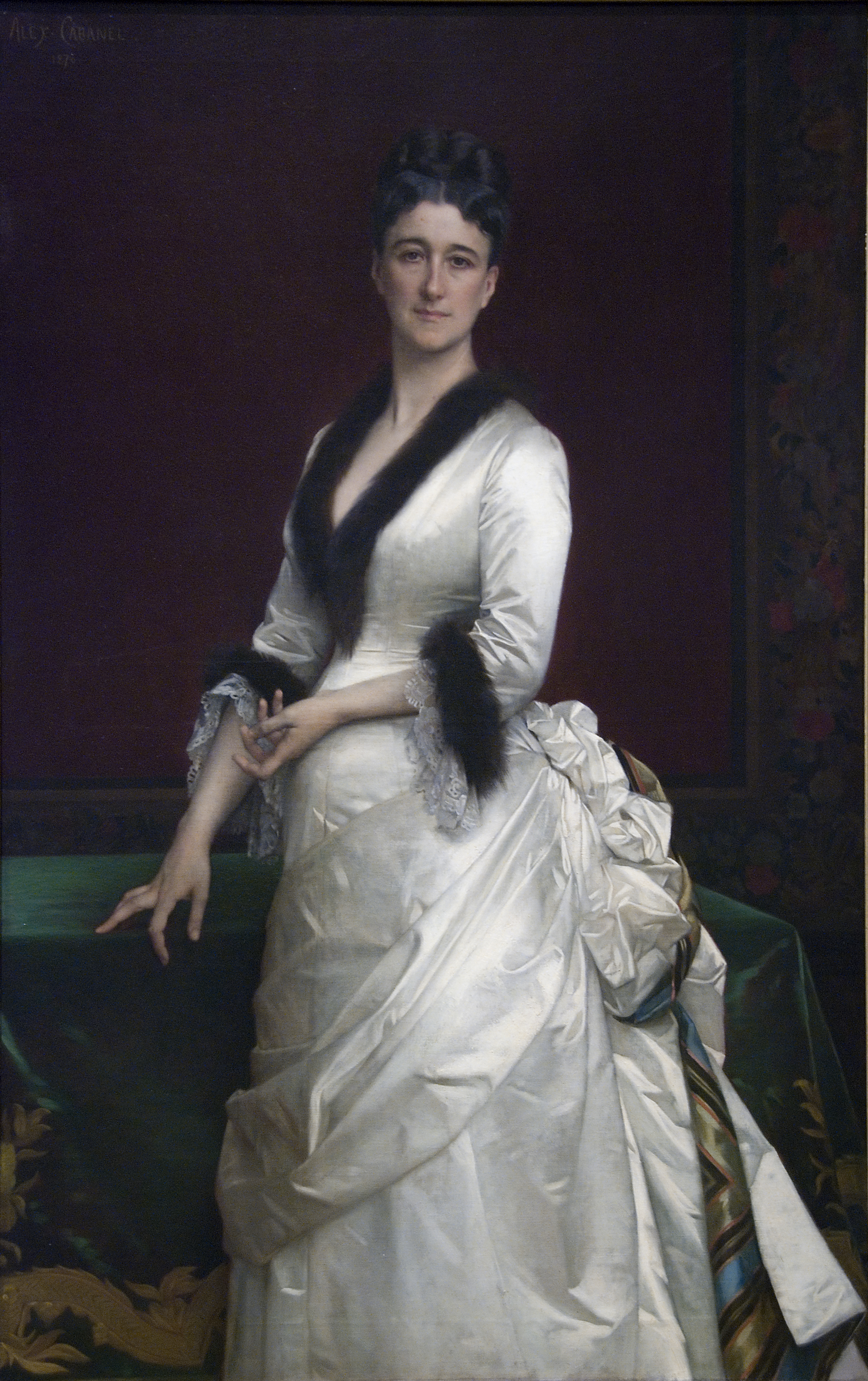
- Portrait of Wolfe by Cabanel, 1876
- Born: March 8, 1828; Manhattan, New York, United States
- Died: April 4, 1887 (aged 59); Manhattan, New York, U.S.
- Resting place: Green-Wood Cemetery, Brooklyn, New York
- Parent(s): John David Wolfe; Dorothea Lorillard
- Relatives: Pierre Lorillard II (grandfather); Pierre Lorillard III (uncle); George Bruce (uncle)

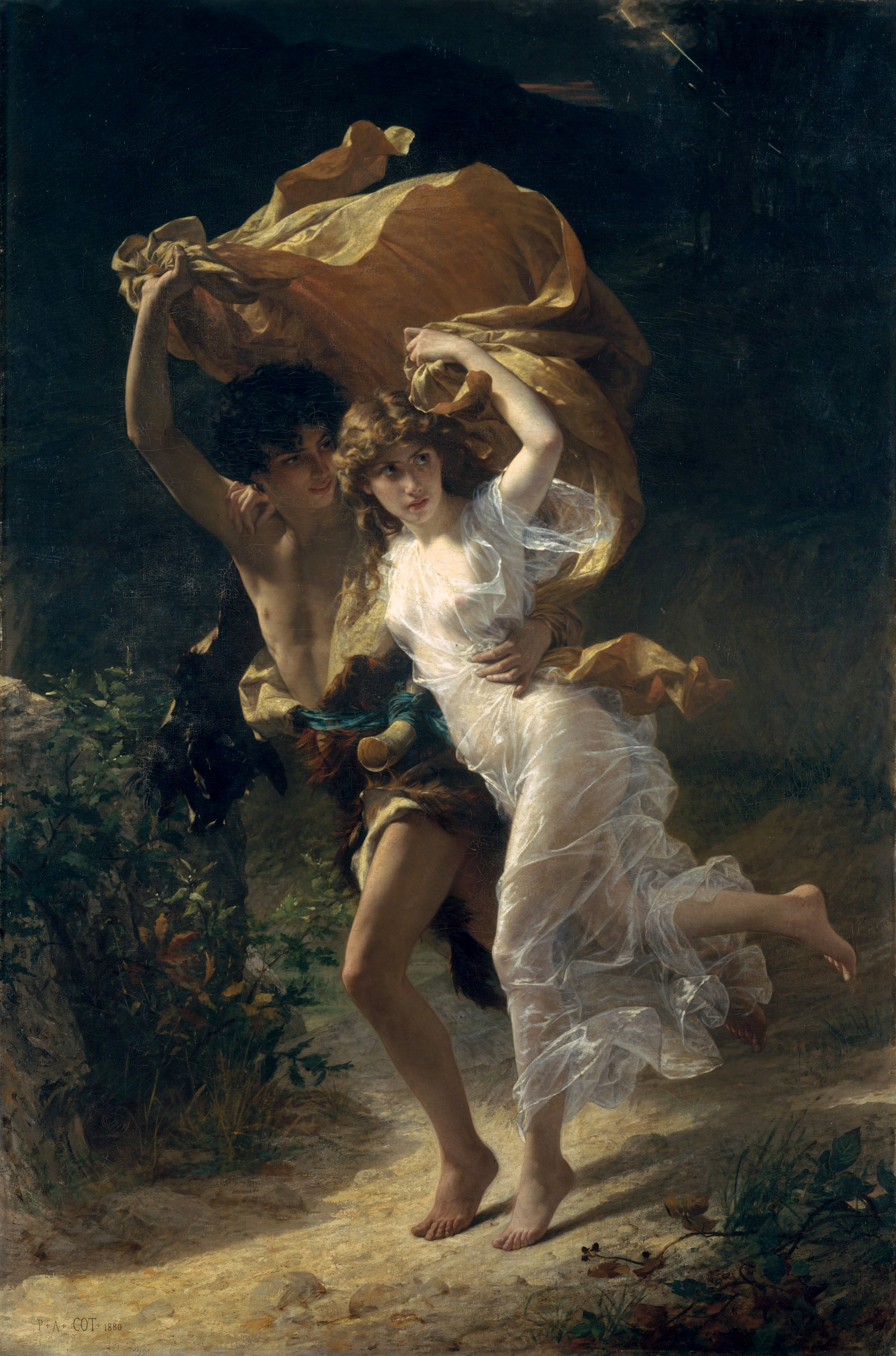
The Storm by Pierre Auguste Cot was commissioned by Catharine Lorillard Wolfe under the guidance of her cousin John Wolfe, one of Cot's principal patrons.

Catharine Lorillard Wolfe (8 March 1828 – 4 April 1887) was an American philanthropist and art collector. Though she gave large amounts of money to institutions such as Grace Episcopal Church and Union College, her most significant gifts were two bequests to the Metropolitan Museum of Art in New York City. She left her large collection of popular contemporary paintings to the museum, together with $200,000.

== Early life and family ==
Wolfe was the daughter of John David Wolfe (1792–1872), and Dorothea Ann Lorillard (1798–1866). Her father was a New York merchant and real estate developer who was the president and a founder of the American Museum of Natural History while her mother was a partial inheritor of the Lorillard tobacco fortune. Her sister was Mary Lorillard Wolfe (1823–1847), who was married to William Bayard Hoffman (d. 1880) before her early death, and her brother was David Lorillard Wolfe (1825–1829), who died young.

Her paternal grandfather was David Wolfe (1748–1836), an officer during the Revolution in the Paymaster's department, and her maternal grandfather was Pierre Lorillard II (1764–1843), both of New York. Her aunt, Catherine Wolfe, married George Bruce (1781–1866).

== Life ==
Wolfe led a private and sheltered life after the death of her mother in 1867. After the death of her father in 1872, she inherited the family fortune which was estimated at $12,000,000 (equivalent to $322,500,000 in 2025), which she used to continue their philanthropic activities. She supported the Newsboys' Lodging House and Industrial School (an outgrowth of Charles Loring Brace's movement to help care for New York's homeless children); she financed archaeological missions, including one that unearthed Nippur; she was also involved with the American Museum of Natural History. She provided $10,000, half the funding for the creation of Bishop Whitaker's School for Girls in Reno, Nevada, on the condition that Episcopal Bishop Ozi William Whitaker raise the other half from other sources. The school was founded in 1876 and operated until 1894.

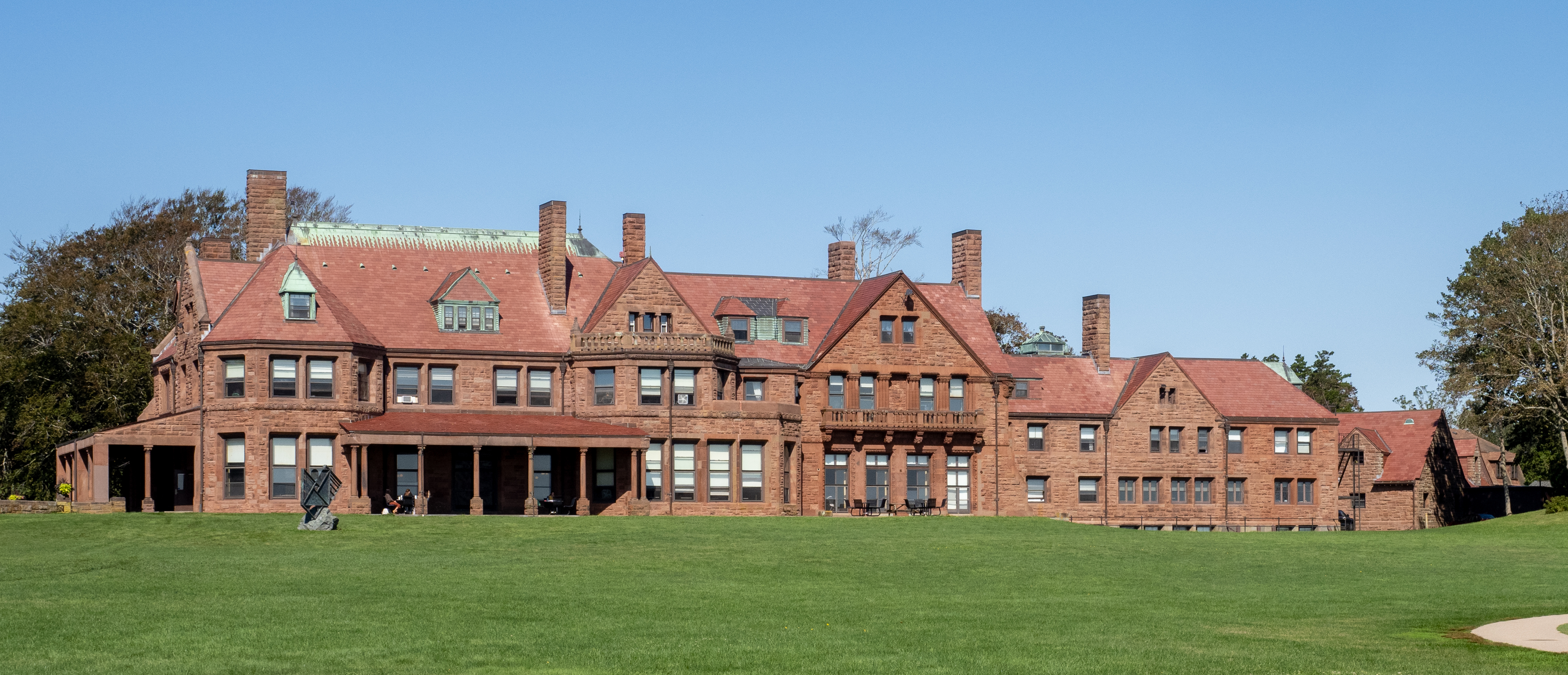
Vinland Estate in Newport, Rhode Island

Wolfe, who did not marry, had a home in Newport, Rhode Island, known as "Vinland," designed and built in 1882 by Peabody & Stearns that featured a Romanesque Revival style exterior consisting of red sandstone with Aesthetic Movement style elements, and built on land acquired from the estate of William Beach Lawrence for $200,000. She also had a home in Throggs Neck and in Madison Square and East 24th Street in New York City.

=== The Wolfe Fund ===
The bequest of her art collection was her most significant philanthropic endeavor. Her collection gave the Metropolitan its first significant representation of the kinds of paintings that appealed to the general public. Star attractions in her collection included Ludwig Knaus's Holy Family and Jules Breton's Procession of Pardon in Brittany. The opening of the Catharine Lorillard Wolfe Wing displaying these popular paintings, coupled with the Museum's simultaneous acquisition by gift of Rosa Bonheur's enormously popular painting The Horse Fair (1853–55), brought to the Metropolitan, for the first time, large numbers of people from beyond the elite circles that traditionally constituted its audiences. The large crowds that Wolfe's collection attracted encouraged other American museums to similarly reach out to members of America's emerging urban middle classes.

Wolfe's gift of $200,000 (equivalent to $7,167,000 in 2025) was the first permanent endowment fund for buying art ever given to a major American museum. It helped launch the competitive cycle of giving that transformed museums in New York, Boston, Philadelphia, and Chicago, from the private pursuits of rich art lovers to professional institutions dedicated to educating large audiences and promoting modern art. Among the masterpieces of world art that the Metropolitan has since acquired using the Wolfe Fund are Pierre-Auguste Renoir's Madame Charpentier and her Children, Jacques-Louis David's Death of Socrates, and Winslow Homer's The Gulf Stream.

== Estate ==
Wolfe died at age 59 in April 1887. According to her obituary in The New York Times, "Society people have always understood that she had a romance, and her father's will implies as much. But whatever the fact, it has not been discussed for many years."

A simple funeral service was held for her at Grace Church with Charles G. Landon, Cornelius Vanderbilt, Benjamin Hazard Field, Robert E. Livingston, the Rev. Dr. William Ferdinand Morgan, William Colford Schermerhorn, John Jacob Astor III, and J. M. Brown acting as pallbearers. The attendees included Mr. and Mrs. Pierre Lorillard, Mr. and Mrs. Jacob Lorillard, Mr. and Mrs. Lewis Lorillard, Mr. and Mrs. Kernochan, Mrs. Barhey, Col. and Mrs. Kip, Mr. and Mrs. David Wolfe Bishop (her second cousin), Mr. and Mrs. Bruce, Mr. and Bruce Brown, Catherine Wolfe Bruce, Mr. and Mrs. John Wolfe, the Misses Hoffman, Mr. and Mrs. Pierre Lorillard, Jr., Mr. and Mrs. Kent, Griswold Lorillard, Jacob Lorillard, ex-Judge Charles A. Peabody, and Albon P. Man.

Her estate, which was worth between $8,000,000 (equivalent to $286,667,000 in 2025) and $10,000,000 (equivalent to $358,333,000 in 2025) consisted of land, stores, dwellings, factories, oil paintings, water colors, stocks, bonds, mortgages, money and other real and personal property. The executors of her estate were David Wolfe Bishop and David Wolfe Bruce. The principal beneficiaries, besides the Metropolitan Museum, were her extended family members.
