= John Jacob Astor VI =

American socialite and businessman (1912–1992)

- Born: August 14, 1912; New York City, U.S.
- Died: June 26, 1992 (aged 79); Miami Beach, Florida U.S.
- Burial place: Trinity Church Cemetery, New York City, New York, U.S.
- Education: St. George's School; Harvard University
- Occupation: International Mercantile Marine Company
- Spouses: Ellen Tuck French (m. 1934; div. 1943) Gertrude Gretsch (m. 1944; div. 1954) Dolores Margaret Fullman (m. 1954; div. 1955) Sue Sandford (m. 1956; died 1985)
- Children: 2
- Parent(s): John Jacob Astor IV; Madeleine Talmage Force
- Relatives: Astor family

John Jacob Astor VI (August 14, 1912 – June 26, 1992) was an American socialite and shipping businessman. He was a member of the Astor family and dubbed the "Titanic Baby" for his affiliation with the RMS Titanic. Astor was born four months after his father, Colonel John Jacob Astor IV, died in the sinking of the Titanic. His pregnant mother Madeleine Astor survived the sinking.

Astor was known for his legal battles with the estate of his elder half-brother, Vincent Astor, to inherit a larger portion of their father's $85 million fortune (approximately $2.8 billion in 2025 dollars). He was also known for his many engagements and four marriages to prominent society women.

== Early life ==
John Jacob Astor VI (nicknamed "Jakey") was born at 840 Fifth Avenue in New York City on August 14, 1912. He was the son of Colonel John Jacob Astor IV (nicknamed "Jack") and socialite Madeleine Talmage Force. Jakey's parents' marriage, on September 9, 1911, had sparked much controversy both because of their 29-year age difference, and because Colonel Astor had been divorced from his first wife, socialite Ava Lowle Willing, only one year earlier, on March 5, 1910.

The newlyweds were returning home aboard the Titanic after honeymooning in Egypt and Europe. Madeleine was five months pregnant with Jakey when her husband put her in one of the ship's lifeboats. She was rescued two and a half hours after her husband went down with the ship.

After Jack's death, Madeleine raised their son at the Astors' Newport, Rhode Island, mansion, Beechwood, as part of the Astor family. She married banker William Karl Dick in 1916 and boxer Enzo Fiermonte in 1933. With Dick, she had two more sons: William Force Dick and John Henry Dick II. Fiermonte taught her sons boxing.

Astor, who had become close to Dick, strongly opposed the union with Fiermonte and repeatedly tried to convince his mother to end the relationship. This caused a rift between the two, though they reconciled within several months of the marriage. When asked if his mother was marrying Fiermonte, he responded, "Unfortunately, it's true".

Astor graduated from St. George's School in Middletown, Rhode Island, and from Harvard University.

== Inheritance ==
Under the terms of Colonel Astor's will, Madeleine received relatively little of her husband's $85 million estate (approximately $2.8 billion in 2025 dollars). This included his estate in Rhinebeck and his yacht, the Noma. William Vincent Astor, the Colonel's son from his first marriage, received $69 million (about $2.3 billion in 2025 dollars), while the Colonel's daughter from his first marriage, Ava Alice Muriel Astor, received a $10 million trust fund (about $330 million in 2025 dollars).

The Colonel's 19-year-old widow Madeleine received the annual income from a $5 million trust fund (about $170 million in 2025 dollars), supplemented by an annual payment of $500,000 (about $17 million in 2025 dollars), as well as use of his New York mansion at 65th Street & Fifth Avenue, all its furnishings, and his Newport mansion Beechwood and all of its furnishings, the pick of whichever luxury limousine she wanted from his collection, and five of his prized horses, provided that she did not remarry. While not listed by name, his father's will mentioned that any surviving child other than his children Vincent and Ava would receive a bequest of $3 million, to be held in trust until the child reached age 21. Jakey inherited the $3 million on his 21st birthday, which by that point had grown to $5 million (about $124 million in 2025 dollars). When Madeleine died in late March 1940, she left him a diamond solitaire ring worth $50,000 (about $1,150,000 in 2025 dollars) and a pearl necklace worth $1,525 (about $35,050 in 2025 dollars).

Elder half-brother Vincent's contempt for Madeleine led him to believe that Jakey was not even a biological Astor. Having despised his younger half-brother since birth, Vincent left him nothing in his will. Jakey felt cheated and said Vincent "had the legal, not the moral, right to keep all the money". After Vincent died childless in February 1959, Jakey sued Vincent's widow Roberta Brooke Russell for his inheritance. He was convinced that Vincent was "mentally incompetent" when signing his last will in June 1958 due to alcoholism, but Brooke insisted Vincent was "fully competent". While Vincent was hospitalized, Brooke often brought him liquor, and Jakey accused her of using the liquor to influence the will in her favor. He ended up settling for $250,000 (about $2.8 million in 2025 dollars). The rest of the money remained with the Vincent Astor foundation and Brooke.

== Personal life ==
Astor became engaged to Eileen Sherman Gillespie (1915–2008), the elder daughter of Lieutenant Lawrence Lewis Gillespie and Irene Muriel Augusta Sherman, in early December 1933. Irene's parents were businessman William Watts Sherman of Duncan, Sherman & Company and Sophia Augusta Brown. Lawrence's father was Major General George Lewis Gillespie Jr. a Medal of Honor recipient and Chief Engineer of the United States Army. They planned to marry on February 6, 1934, but she called the wedding off on January 22 after a bitter argument. Heartbroken, Astor went to Shanghai shortly afterward to grieve, returning to America in early May 1934. He blamed her parents for interfering with the relationship. He once suggested they could reconcile, saying, "I was willing to marry her, and if I were to think about it, I might still be willing to marry her." Eileen's daughter Marguerite "Margy" Slocum later said of him: "She felt that he had grown up lonely... He was a bit eccentric, and she felt he wasn't mature enough to get married."

A few weeks after returning from Shanghai, Astor became engaged to Eileen's close friend socialite Ellen Tuck "Tucky" French (1915–1974), the elder daughter of Francis Ormond "Frank" French II and Eleanor Livingston Burrill. They married on June 30, 1934, at Trinity Church in Newport, Rhode Island. Tucky was a granddaughter of Amos Tuck French, and had been attracted to Jakey while he was engaged to Eileen. Tucky was to be a bridesmaid at Jakey and Eileen's wedding. The couple had one son before divorcing in May 1943.

- William Backhouse Astor III (1935–2008), who was an investment banker. He married and later divorced Charlotte Ann Fisk (1936–2008), daughter of Earl Ellsworth Fisk and Florence Leavitt.

At the time of their son's birth, Astor was working at the International Mercantile Marine Co. Another of Tucky's sisters, Virginia Middleton French (1917–2011), married William Force Dick, Astor's half-brother through his mother, on December 18, 1941, before her marriage to Philip B. Pool. The two had respectively served as matron of honor and usher to Astor and Tucky's wedding. Astor served as an usher and Tucky was matron of honor to Virginia and William's wedding. Virginia and Vincent were appointed the godparents of William Backhouse Astor III.

On September 18, 1944, in New York City, Astor married for the second time, to Gertrude Gretsch (1923–1999), daughter of Walter and Gertrude B. Gretsch. Walter Gretsch was a son of businessman and industrialist Friedrich Gretsch, who founded the Gretsch manufacturing company. Astor and Gretsch divorced on August 2, 1954, after a four-year separation, though the Mexican divorce was ruled invalid in 1956. An American divorce soon followed. Before their separation and divorce, the couple had a daughter:

- Mary Jacqueline Astor (b. 1949), who married John Rozet Drexel IV (b. 1945), a son of John Rozet Drexel III and Mildred Sophia Noreen Stonor and 2x great-grandson of Anthony Joseph Drexel, in 1984.

On August 6, 1954, Astor married for the third time, to Dolores Margaret "Dolly" Fullman (born c. 1928) in Arlington, Virginia. It was the 26-year-old Dolly's second marriage. They separated soon after returning from their honeymoon and divorced.

Astor married his fourth and final wife, Sue Sandford, in 1956. They remained married until her death in 1985.

Astor died in Miami Beach, Florida, on June 26, 1992, at the age of 79. His body was returned to New York where he was buried with his parents in the Trinity Church Cemetery.

=== Descendants ===
Through his son, Astor was a grandfather to two boys, William Backhouse Astor IV (b. 1959) and Gregory Todd Astor (b. 1966), who portrayed Colonel Astor in Titanic the Musical in April 2012. He was also a grandfather to Nicholas Astor Drexel through his daughter. Gregory and his wife Robin have three children: Alexandra Astor, Rebecca Charlotte Astor, and Stephen William Astor.

== Name confusion ==
Even though some sources refer to Jakey as John Jacob V, John Jacob Astor, 1st Baron Astor of Hever (1886–1971) was born first and therefore is actually John Jacob Astor V. Sir Jakie Astor (1918–2000), youngest brother of David Astor, was John Jacob Astor VII; the 3rd Baron Astor of Hever is John Jacob Astor VIII. Jakey is sometimes (incorrectly) referred to as John Jacob III.
