= Pierre Lorillard II =

American business tycoon

- Born: Pierre Abraham Lorillard II; September 7, 1764; New York City, Province of New York, British America
- Died: May 23, 1843 (aged 78); New York City
- Resting place: New York Marble Cemetery
- Known for: Tobacco manufacturer
- Spouse: Maria Dorothea Schultz
- Children: Maria Dorothea Lorillard; Catherine Lorillard; Pierre Lorillard III; Dorothea Anne Lorillard; Eleanor Eliza Lorillard
- Relatives: Pierre Lorillard IV (grandson)

Pierre or Peter Abraham Lorillard II (September 7, 1764 – May 23, 1843), also known as Peter Lorillard, Jr., was an American tobacco manufacturer, industrialist, banker, businessman, and real estate tycoon.

== Early life ==
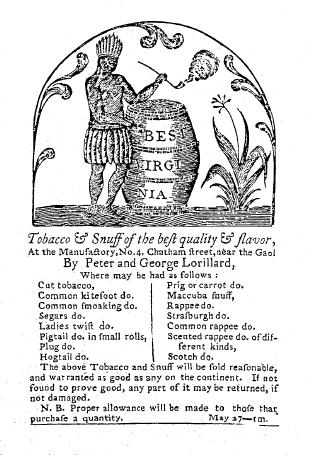
1789 advertisement for Peter and George Lorillard's Tobacco & Snuff of the best quality & flavor

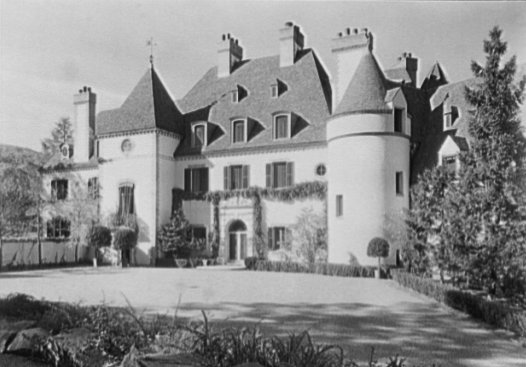
Lorillard residence in Tuxedo Park, 1934

Lorillard was born on September 7, 1764, in Manhattan, New York City.

== Career ==
Lorillard's father, Pierre Abraham Lorillard (also known as 'Pierre Lorillard I'), was the founder of the Lorillard Tobacco Company. Lorillard's father made the first American tobacco fortune by developing a tobacco firm that he started in 1760. Originally the business was a snuff-grinding factory located in a rented house in lower Manhattan. It was called Lorillard's Snuff and Tobacco company and sometimes the name was abbreviated as J. Lorillard. Later the firm moved to a better location on the Bronx River. Lorillard II took over and continued to manage and operate the family business after his father's death in 1776.

=== Social clubs ===
Lorillard II was a member of several social clubs including the Meadow Brook Hunt Country Club (a fox hunting club) and the Narragansett Gun Club. He often is associated with Tuxedo Park since between 1802 and 1812 he purchased the first tracts of land upon which it later would be developed. The village and the surrounding area were developed in 1886 by his grandson Pierre Lorillard IV as a resort for the socially prominent.

== Personal life ==
In 1788, Lorillard married Maria Dorothea Schultz. They lived at 521 Broadway in Manhattan. Together, they had five children:

- Maria Dorothea Lorillard (1790–1848), who married Thomas Alexander Ronalds, a New York merchant.
- Catherine Lorillard (1794–1882), who married her younger sister's widower, William Augustus Spencer.
- Pierre Lorillard III (1796–1867), who married Catherine Anne Griswold, whose family owned "the great New York mercantile house of N. L. & G. Griswold, known to their rivals as "No Loss and Great Gain Griswold," importers of rum, sugar, and tea."
- Dorothea Anne Lorillard (1798–1866), who married John David Wolfe, a real estate developer.
- Eleanora Eliza Lorillard (1801–1843), who was also married to William Augustus Spencer, son of U.S. Representative Ambrose Spencer and brother of John Canfield Spencer, the United States Secretary of War and Treasury, in 1823.

== Death and legacy ==
On May 23rd, 1843 Lorillard died at the age of 78, outliving his brothers George and Jacob. He was buried at the New York Marble Cemetery. A newspaper reporter writing his obituary tried to describe an extremely wealthy American and used the relatively new word, "millionaire".

While the word "millionaire" had been in use in the United Kingdom since at least 1816, apparently it was used for the first time in the United States in 1843 when it was used to describe Lorillard, although he was not the first American to own one million dollars' worth of property. While he was one of the wealthiest men in America, he was not the richest at the time, that being John Jacob Astor. Lorillard just happened to have been the first to be called a millionaire in newspapers. Cleveland Amory incorrectly reports that it was in Lorillard's 1843 obituary that the first use of the word "millionaire" appeared in print anywhere.

Philip Hone, one-time mayor of New York, wrote about Lorillard in his famous diary,

He was a tobacconist, and his memory will be preserved in the annals of New York by the celebrity of "Lorillard's Snuff and Tobacco." He led people by the nose for the best part of the century, and made his enormous fortune by giving them that to chew which they could not swallow.

=== Descendants ===
Through his eldest daughter Maria, he was the grandfather of Mary, Margaret and Dorothea Ann Ronalds, none of whom married; Catherine Ronalds (1820–1885), who married Assistant Secretary of State John Addison Thomas (1811–1858), Eleanora Lorillard Ronalds (1825–1879), who married U.S. Representative Frederick A. Conkling (1816–1891) (brother of U.S. Senator Roscoe Conkling), Julia Ronalds, who died young, Thomas Alexander Ronalds (d. 1872), who married Adeline Freeman (b. 1824) (daughter of Dr. Freeman), Peter Lorillard Ronalds (1826–1905), who married Mary Frances Carter (1839–1916), and George Lorillard Ronalds (1833–1875), who married Pauline Antoinette Witthaus, daughter of R.A. Witthaus, Esq. in 1863.

Through his daughter Dorothea, he was the grandfather of Mary Lorillard Wolfe (1823–1847), who was married to William Bayard Hoffman (d. 1880) before her early death, David Lorillard Wolfe (1825–1829), who died young, and Catharine Lorillard Wolfe (1828–1887), the philanthropist and art collector who gave large amounts of money to institutions such as Grace Episcopal Church and Union College, and the Metropolitan Museum of Art in New York City.

Through his daughter Eleonora, he was the grandfather of Lorillard Spencer (1827–1888), who was married to Sarah Johnson Griswold (1827–1905). They were the parents of Eleanor Spencer (b. 1851), who married Don Virginius Cenci, 6th Prince of Vicovaro (b. 1840), in 1870, and Lorillard Spencer (1860–1912), who was married to Caroline Berryman Spencer (1861–1948), and were the parents of Lorillard Spencer (1883–1939), who was president of Atlantic Aircraft and was married to Katherine Emmons Force (1891–1956), both of whom were prominent in Newport, Rhode Island, society.
