= Katherine Emmons Force =

American real estate businesswoman and socialite

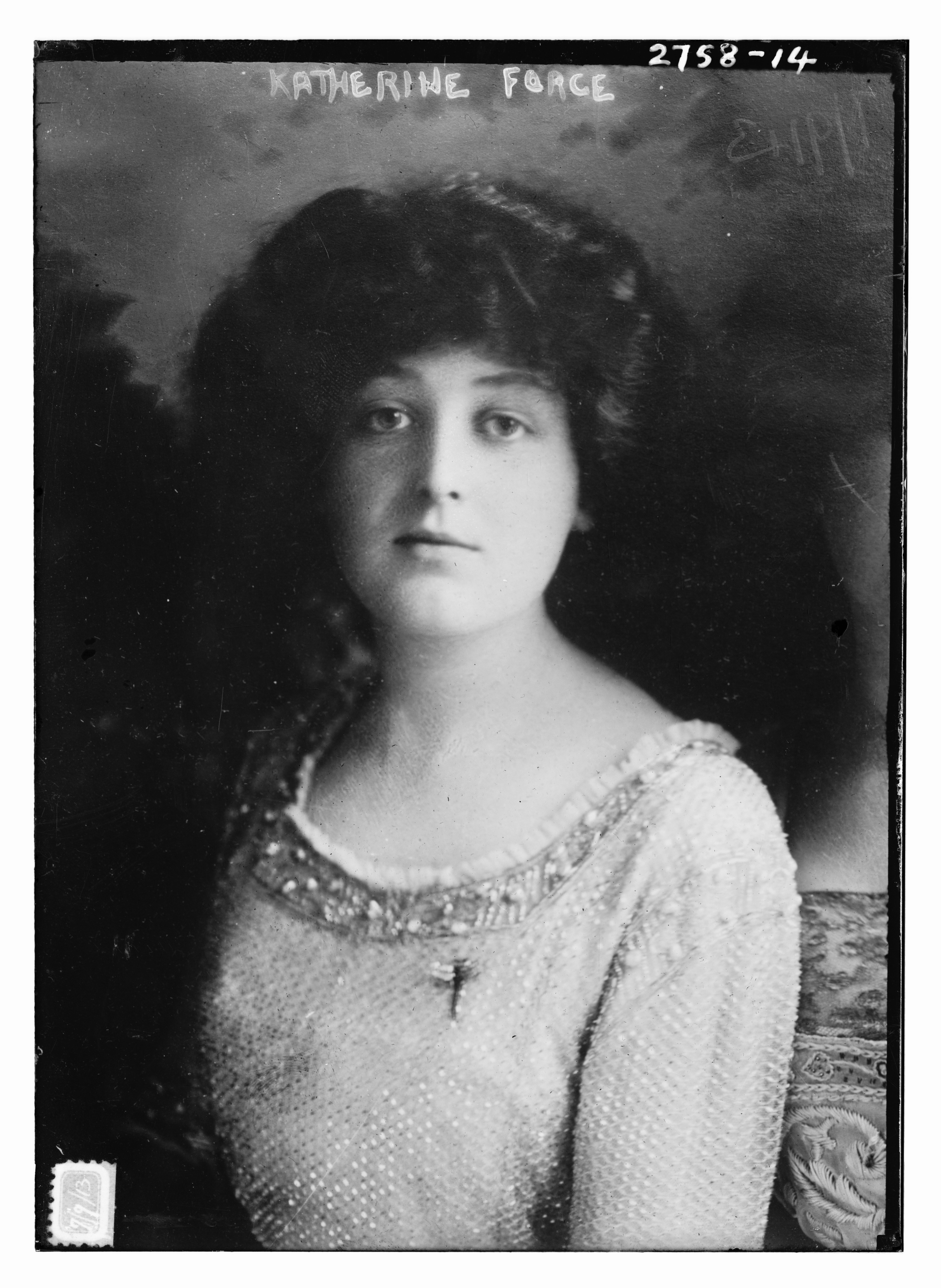
- Photograph of Katherine, c. 1908.
- Born: March 12, 1891; Brooklyn, New York, U.S.
- Died: September 8, 1956 (aged 65); Newport, Rhode Island, U.S.
- Occupation: Businesswoman
- Spouse: Lorillard Suydam Spencer (m. 1922; died 1939)
- Children: 3
- Relatives: Madeleine Talmage Force (sister); John Jacob Astor VI (nephew); Tunis V. P. Talmage (grandfather)

Katherine Emmons Force Spencer (March 12, 1891 – September 8, 1956) was an American real estate investor and socialite. She was a member of the zoning board for Newport, Rhode Island.

== Early life ==
Katherine Emmons Force was born on March 12, 1891, in Brooklyn, New York. She was the elder daughter of William Hurlbut Force and Katherine Arvilla (née Talmage) Force. Her younger sister Madeleine was the widow of Colonel John Jacob Astor IV of the Astor family, who died during the sinking of the Titanic in 1912. Her maternal grandfather was New York State Assemblyman Tunis V. P. Talmage, and her great-grandfather Thomas G. Talmage was Mayor of Brooklyn.

== Personal life ==
On December 6, 1922, Force was married to Lorillard Suydam Spencer (1883–1939) at the home of her sister Madeline, then Mrs. William Karl Dick. Lorillard, who was divorced from his first wife, Mary Ridgeley Sands, was the son of Lorillard Spencer and Caroline Suydam (née Berryman) Spencer. Together they had two sons and a daughter:

- Katherine Talmage Lorillard Spencer (1923–1992), who married Joseph Henry Doherty (1923–1992) in 1957.
- Stephen Wolcott Spencer (1925–2010), who wed Marjorie Potts, daughter of Owen Lewis Potts of Santiago, Chile, in 1957.
- William Hurlbut Force Spencer (1929–2022), who married Louise Thacher Jones (1927–2013) in 1956.

Later in her life, she became a real estate investor and was a member of the zoning board for Newport.

Her husband died in 1939. She died of a heart attack at her cottage, Chasteullux, in Newport, Rhode Island, on September 8, 1956.
