= Lorillard S. Spencer =

President of Atlantic Aircraft (1883–1939)

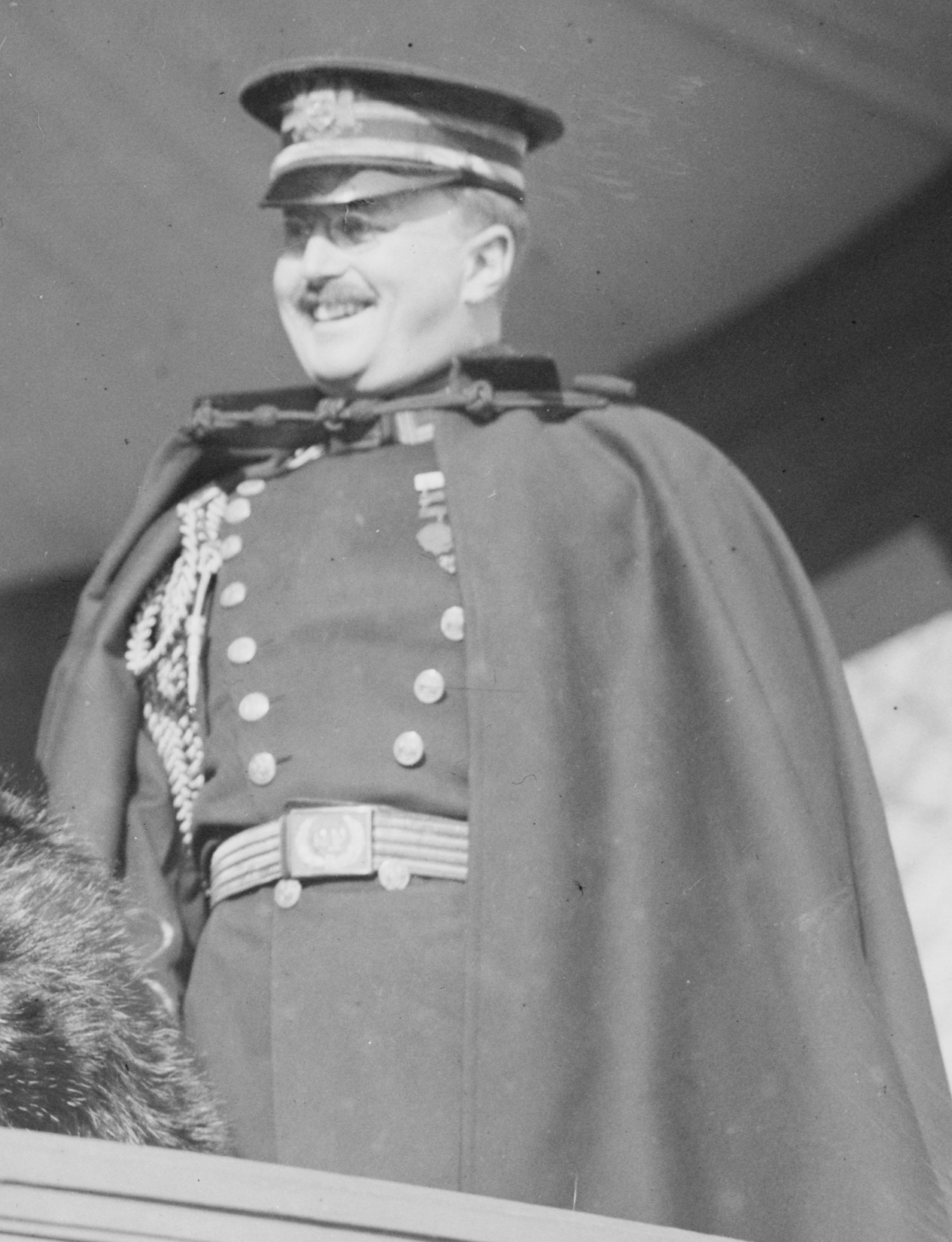
- Spencer circa 1918
- Born: Lorillard Suydam Spencer; July 4, 1883; Manhattan, New York City, U.S.
- Died: June 9, 1939 (aged 55); Newport, Rhode Island, U.S.
- Title: President of Atlantic Aircraft
- Spouses: Mary Ridgeley Sands (m. 1905; div. 1922) Katherine Emmons Force (m. 1922)
- Children: Lorillard Suydam Spencer Jr.; Stephen Wolcott Spencer; William Hurlbut Force Spencer
- Parents: Lorillard Spencer; Caroline Berryman Spencer
- Military career
- Allegiance: United States
- Branch: United States Army
- Service years: 1918
- Rank: Major (also Colonel in the New York Militia)
- Conflicts: World War I Battle of Champagne-Argonne

Lorillard Suydam Spencer Sr. (July 4, 1883 - June 9, 1939) was an American businessman and soldier, the president of Atlantic Aircraft and prominent in Newport, Rhode Island society. He served as the military secretary to Charles Seymour Whitman, the New York Governor.

== Biography ==
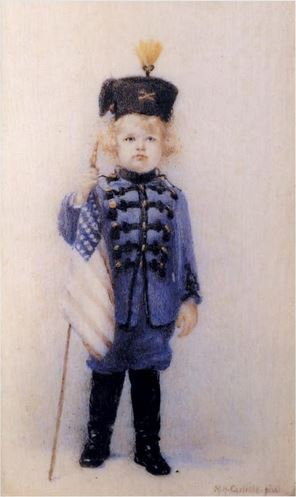
Lorillard S. Spencer by Mary Helen Carlisle

He was born on July 4, 1883, in Manhattan, New York City to Lorillard Spencer and Caroline Suydam Berryman, a granddaughter of Stephen Whitney of New York. Caroline would later become a missionary in the Philippines.

On December 16, 1910, he was elected as the temporary chairman of the New York City Council of the Boy Scouts of America.

During World War I, he was the commander of the 3rd Battalion of the African American 15th New York Infantry which was inducted into Federal service as the 369th Infantry Regiment (nicknamed "The Harlem Hellfighters"). In September 1918, during the Battle of Champagne-Argonne, he was stuck six times by German machine gun fire. Severely wounded, he was sent home to recover. For his bravery, he was awarded the Distinguished Service Cross, the Croix de Guerre and the Legion of Honour. The latter was presented to him in July 1919 by Ambassador Jean Jules Jusserand. When the men of the 3rd Battalion returned home after the war, he was there to greet them, his fractured leg still in a sling.

He became president of the Witteman Aircraft Corporation in 1921 and the Atlantic Aircraft Corporation in 1923.

He died on June 10, 1939, at his cottage, Chasteullux, in Newport, Rhode Island.

== Personal life ==
He married his first wife, Mary Ridgeley Sands, on September 19, 1905, at Trinity Church in Manhattan, New York City. They divorced in March 1922. They had one son together, Lorillard Suydam Spencer Jr., on June 11, 1906.

He married Katherine Emmons Force on December 6, 1922. They had two sons, Stephen Wolcott Spencer on April 22, 1925, and William Hurlbut Force Spencer on June 13, 1927.

== Legacy ==
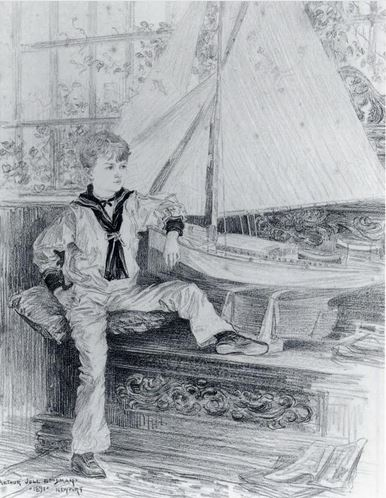
Lorillard S. Spencer by Arthur Jule Goodman

The earliest Filipino Boy Scout troop recorded in history was named after him due to the monetary support provided by his mother, who was an American charity worker in Sulu, Philippines. The Lorillard Spencer Trophy serves as the perpetual award to a local Boy Scout council in the Philippines obtaining the highest record of advancement and membership for the year. The trophy is inscribed as "The Lorillard Spencer Trophy Presented by His Mother in Loving Memory of a Loyal Scouter".

== Military awards ==
- Distinguished Service Cross
- Purple Heart
- Victory Medal
- Legion of Honor (France)
- Croix de Guerre (France)
- Conspicuous Service Cross (New York)
- Long and Faithful Service Award (New York)
