= Frederic Kernochan =

American soldier and lawyer (1876–1937)

- Born: August 12, 1876; Newport, Rhode Island
- Died: February 9, 1937 (aged 60); Tuxedo Park, New York
- Education: St. Mark's School
- Alma mater: Yale University; New York Law School
- Occupations: Soldier, attorney, judge
- Political party: Democrat
- Spouse: Elsie Howland (m. 1910)
- Children: 2
- Parent(s): J. Frederic Kernochan; Mary Stuart Whitney Kernochan
- Relatives: James Powell Kernochan (uncle)
- Awards: Congressional Silver Medal

Frederic Kernochan (August 12, 1876 – January 9, 1937) was an American soldier and lawyer who served as Chief Justice of the Court of Special Sessions.

== Early life ==
Kernochan was born on August 12, 1876, in Newport, Rhode Island. He was the son of attorney J. Frederic Kernochan and the former Mary Stuart Whitney (1849–1922), who were both prominent in New York society. He grew up at 11 East 26th Street, and had four siblings: Eweretta Kernochan (who did not marry), William Kernochan (who died in infancy), Mary Stuart Whitney Kernochan (who married Courtland Smith) and Whitney Kernochan (who married Helen (née Gaynor) Bradford, a daughter of New York City Mayor William Jay Gaynor).

His paternal grandparents were Margaret Eliza (née Seymour) Kernochan and Joseph Kernochan, a Scottish born dry goods merchant and banker who was a founder of the University Club of New York. Among his extended family was uncle James Powell Kernochan. His maternal grandparents were William and Mary Stuart (née McVickar) Whitney (a daughter of merchant Stephen Whitney).

After attending St. Mark's School, Kernochan graduated from Yale University with the class of 1898 (where he was a member of Delta Kappa Epsilon and Skull and Bones), and then attended New York Law School, where he graduated in 1901, the same year he was admitted to the New York bar.

== Career ==
From January 1, 1903, to April 30, 1903, Kernochan served as Assistant Corporation Counsel in New York City followed by Assistant District Attorney in New York County from 1903 to 1905. In 1905, he followed William Rand when Rand left the District Attorney's office and joined the firm of Rand, Moffatt & Webb in New York City, where he practiced law until 1907.

In April 1907, he was appointed a New York City Magistrate by Mayor George B. McClellan Jr. In 1908, he dismissed all charges and released from custody William K. Vanderbilt Jr. after a traffic patrolman had taken him into custody for speeding. In December of the same year, the then unmarried Kernochan was "drawn into a declaration yesterday in the Harlem Police Court that, so far as he personally was concerned, the preponderance of evidence being against matrimony, he proposed to continue to keep out of it." In response, the wife stated: "Well, if you are single, you stay that way." In 1911, Kernochan decided "in the West Side Court, without hearing any witnesses, the Russian ballet performance" that was at "the Winter Garden was not of a nature to call for police interference and refused to issue a summons." He declined to hear testimony because he had, in fact, gone to see the performance "accompanied by a friend, a Director of the Metropolitan Opera Company, who had seen the performance before the complaints had reached the Mayor" and "was willing to take the responsibility for the statement that there is nothing that need offend anybody."

On July 2, 1913, he was appointed Justice of the New York Court of Special Sessions by Mayor William Jay Gaynor to succeed Justice Deuel, "whose term expired on June 30. Justice Kernochan had four years of his term as Magistrate to serve, and to fill out this term the Mayor appointed Justice Deuel." The position came with a $9,000 per year salary, an increase from the $7,000 per year salary he received as a City Magistrate. In 1919, he was appointed by Mayor Gaynor as Chief Justice of the Court of Special Sessions. He was reappointed for a ten-year term as Chief Justice in 1926 by Mayor Jimmy Walker at a salary of $12,000 per year, and reappointed for another ten-year term in 1936 by Mayor Fiorello LaGuardia at a salary of $18,000 per year (but was paid $13,000 under the pay-cut arrangement). In 1932, Kernochan testified against alliances between Tammany Hall and racketeers.

In February 1933, Kernochan was present when Giuseppe Zangara tried to assassinate then President-elect Franklin D. Roosevelt in Miami, Florida, just seventeen days before Roosevelt's inauguration, following a cruise aboard Vincent Astor's yacht. Kernochan interrogated him in his prison cell in the Dade County Courthouse jail, where Zangara confessed, stating: "I have the gun in my hand. I kill kings and presidents first and next all capitalists."

=== Military service ===
In May 1898, during the Spanish-American War Kernochan enlisted in Battery A, Pennsylvania Light Artillery (formerly the Keystone Battery), which was assigned to guard the shipyards at Newport News, Virginia. The Battery left Newport for Puerto Rico in early August 1898, aboard the transport Manitoba arriving in Puerto Rico on August 10, 1898. His Battery was assigned a position 2 miles north of Ponce until they were ordered home aboard the Mississippi, arriving in New Jersey on September 10, 1898. His Battery was part of the Philadelphia Peace Jubilee in October 1898 before he mustered out of service in November 1898.

Kernochan again enlisted in May 1899, in Troop 1, Squadron A, New York City with whom he saw field service during the Croton Dam Strike in August 1900 before he was discharged from Squadron A in May 1904. Three months later on August 23, 1904, he was commissioned First Lieutenant and was assigned to the 12th New York Infantry Regiment in New York City as Battalion Quartermaster, serving with them until December 1908.

=== Awards and honors ===
In 1886, when he was 10 years old, he rescued his nurse, Louise Valet, from an overturned boat in the Shrewsbury River near Navesink Highlands (on the Atlantic coast just off the coast of Highlands, New Jersey). In 1887, Secretary Charles S. Fairchild awarded him the Congressional Silver Medal for his bravery and in 1913, he was awarded the American Cross of Honor, which is composed of those who have received medals from Congress, gave him another. The Cross of Honor was presented to him by the Mayor Gaynor at City Hall.

== Personal life ==
On January 26, 1910, Kernochan was married to Elizabeth Lawrence "Elsie" Howland (1885–1973) at the Church of the Transfiguration. Elise was a daughter of Louis Meredith Howland (of Howland & Aspinwall) and Virginia Lee (née Lawrence) Howland. The couple were friends with President Franklin D. Roosevelt and Eleanor Roosevelt. Together, they lived at 42 Fifth Avenue in Manhattan and, later, 4 East 95th Street, were the parents of:

- Virginia Kernochan (1912–1981), who married Frederic Foster Carey, a son of George Herbert Carey and Clara (née Foster) Delafield, in 1928. They later divorced and he married Anne Smolianinoff Frelinghuysen.
- Mary Kernochan (1914–1992), who married Crawford Blagden Jr., a great-grandson of Mark Hopkins, in 1934.

Kernochan died of pleural pneumonia on January 9, 1937, aged 60, at Tuxedo Park, New York. His funeral was held at St. Mary's-in-Tuxedo and he was buried at Green-Wood Cemetery in Brooklyn. James Roosevelt, son of President Roosevelt, "represented official Washington" and he arrived with Vincent Astor, "a close friend who had entertained Judge Kernochan on two yacht trips he arranged for President Roosevelt."
