= Charles Cary Rumsey =

American sculptor

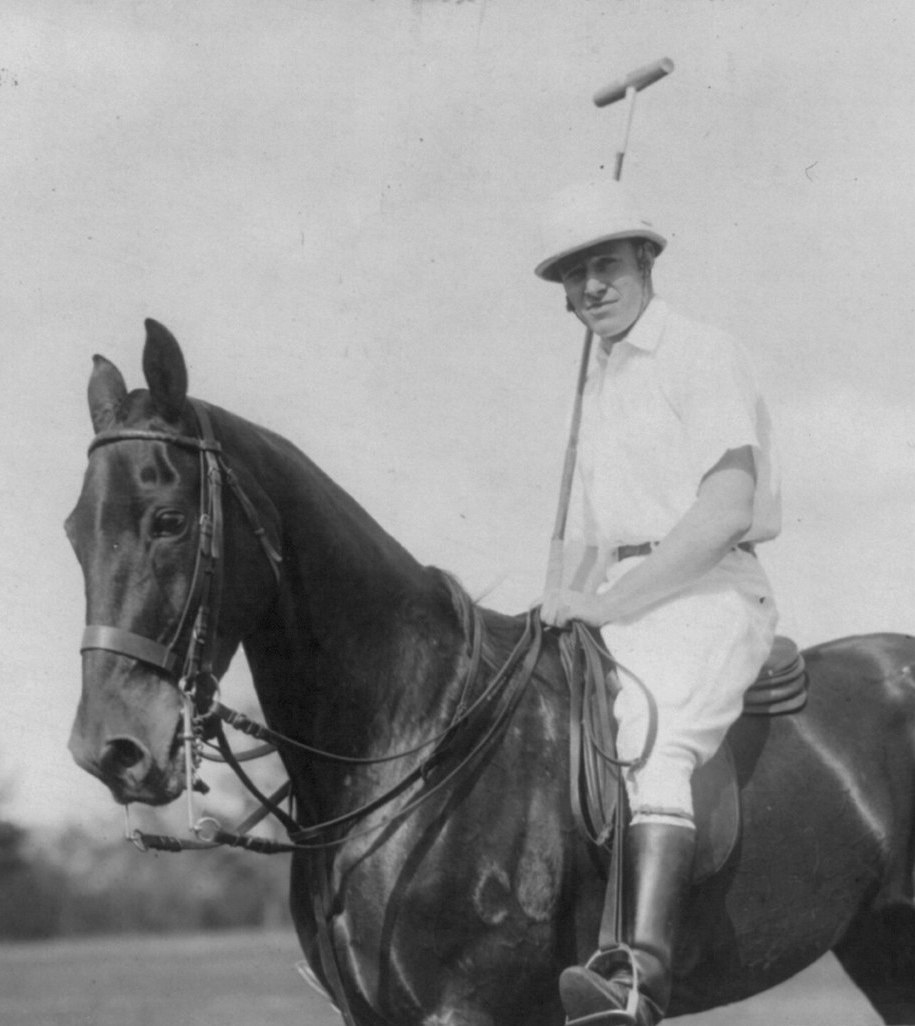

Personal details
- Born: August 29, 1879 Buffalo, New York, United States
- Died: September 21, 1922 (aged 43) Floral Park, New York, United States
- Cause of death: Automobile accident
- Resting place: Forest Lawn Cemetery, Buffalo
- Spouse: Mary Harriman (m. 1910)
- Children: 3
- Relatives: George Cary (uncle); Seward Cary (uncle); Trumbull Cary (great-grandfather)
- Education: Harvard University; Boston Art School; École des Beaux-Arts
- Occupation: Sculptor, Polo player
- Known for: Figurative art

Military service
- Allegiance: United States of America
- Branch/service: United States Army Corps of Engineers
- Rank: Captain
- Unit: 77th Infantry Division
- Battles/wars: World War I

Charles Cary Rumsey (August 29, 1879 – September 21, 1922) was an American sculptor and an eight-goal polo player.

== Early life ==
Charles Rumsey was born on August 29, 1879, in Buffalo, New York. He was the son of Laurence Dana Rumsey, a successful local businessman, and Jennie (née Cary) Rumsey. His siblings included Evelyn Rumsey, who married Rev. Walter R. Lord in 1922; Gertrude Rumsey, who married Carlton Smith; Grace Rumsey, who married Charles W. Goodyear Jr. (son of Charles W. Goodyear) in 1908; and Laurence Dana Rumsey Jr.

His maternal uncles included Seward Cary, a polo-player, and George Cary, a prominent architect. His maternal great-grandfather was Trumbull Cary, a New York State Senator and former New York State Bank Commissioner.

As a child, Rumsey learned to play polo at a young age from his uncle and friend, Devereux Milburn. Known to his family and friends as Pad, he graduated from Harvard University and studied art at the Boston Art School before moving to Paris, France in 1902 to attend the École des Beaux-Arts. His uncle, George Cary, studied there from 1886 to 1889.

== Career ==
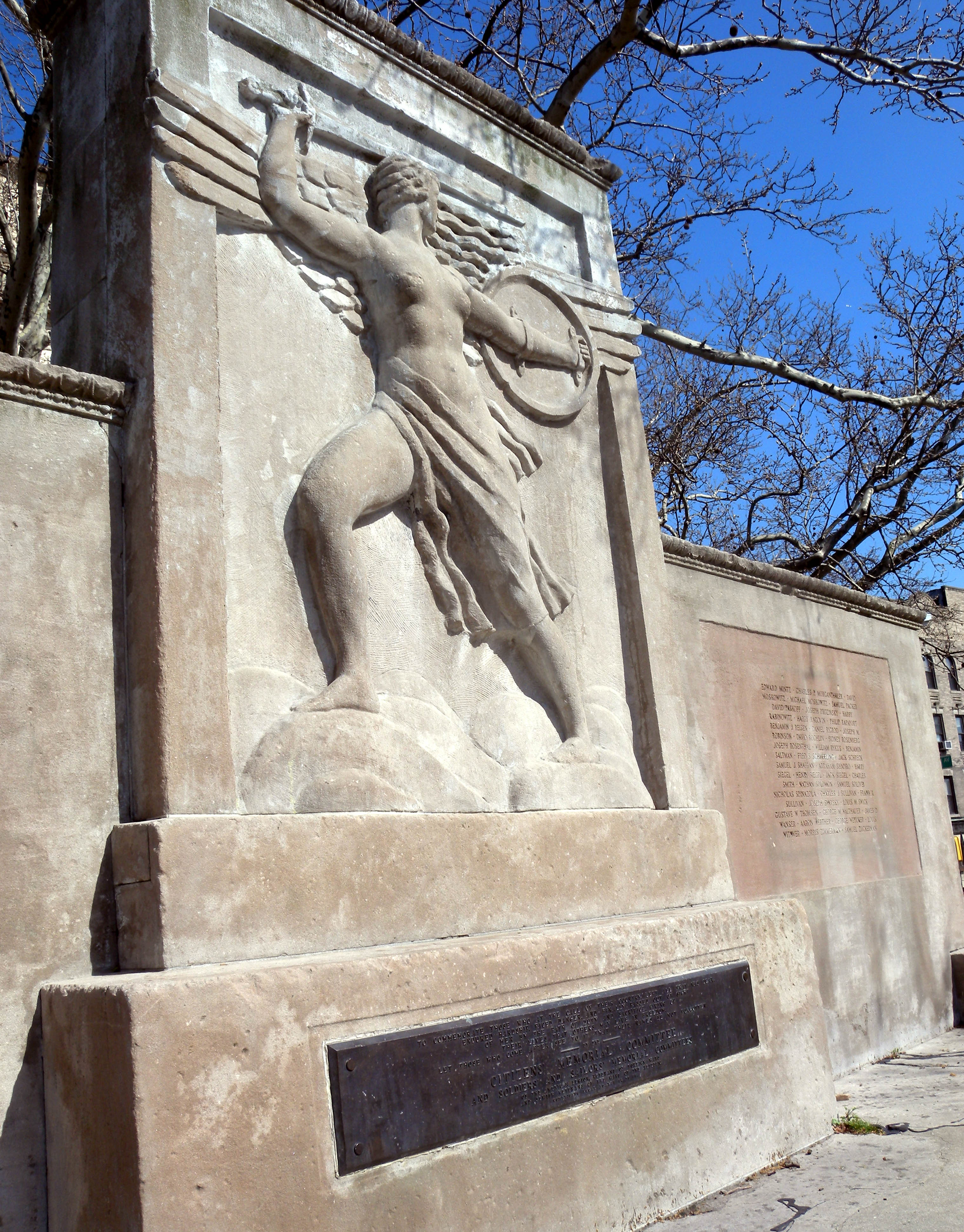
Brownsville War Memorial

In 1901, while still a student at Harvard, Rumsey exhibited a sculpture of a Native American at the Pan-American Exposition in Buffalo.

Rumsey worked mainly in bronze. His passion for horses saw him create statues of the Thoroughbred horses Hamburg and Burgomaster for Harry Payne Whitney, Good and Plenty for Thomas Hitchcock, and World Champion trotter Nancy Hanks for John E. Madden.

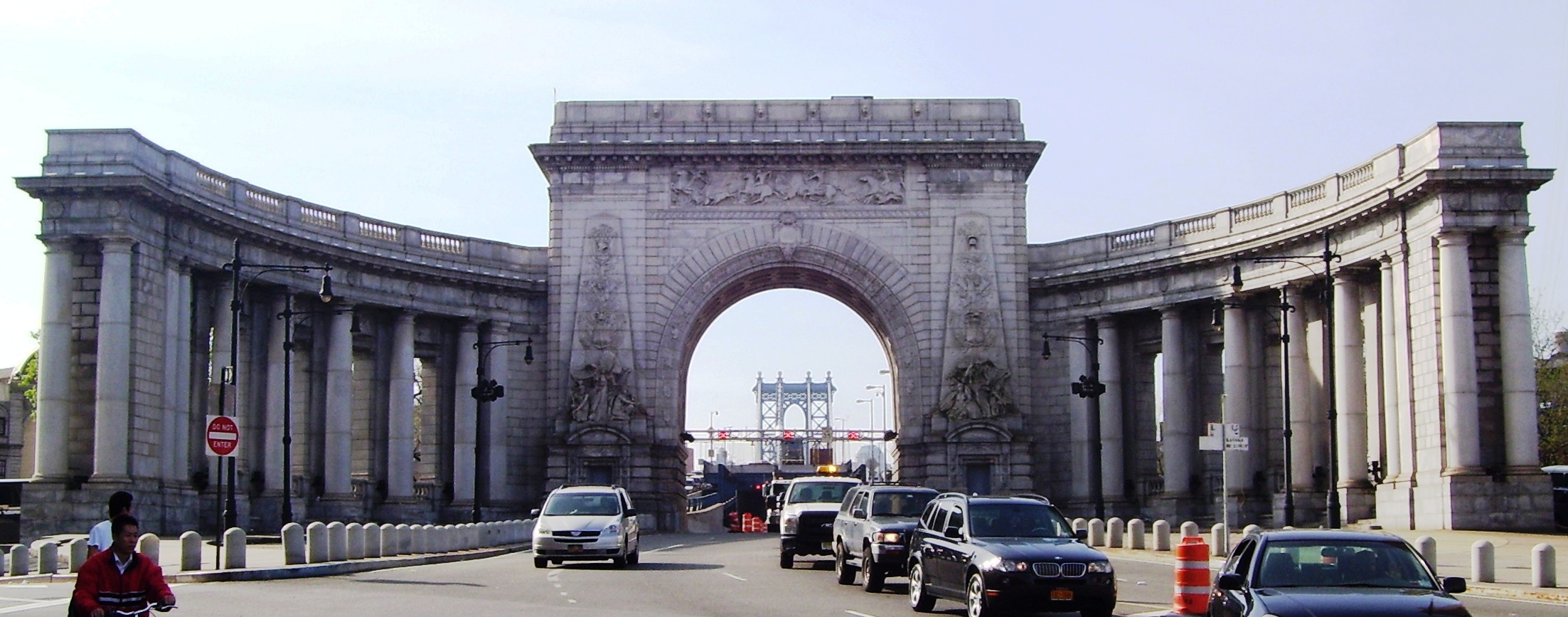
The triumphal arch and colonnade at the Manhattan entrance to the Manhattan Bridge

When Rumsey returned from Paris in 1906, he established himself in an art studio on 59th Street in New York City. He soon thereafter began sculptures for the massive house being built by architects Carrère and Hastings for the railroad magnate E.H. Harriman, called Arden; he did a fireplace surround and other sculptural decorations for the music room there, as well as the "Three Graces Fountain." During this time he courted Harriman's daughter, Mary Harriman; they both shared a love of horses and had first met at the Meadow Brook Steeplechase Association races on Long Island. They married in 1910, much to the surprise of New York society. They maintained a home in Brookville, New York, on Long Island, where they raised three children.

Among Rumsey's other works are three identical equestrian statues of Francisco Pizarro, erected in Trujillo, Spain, the Brownsville War Memorial in Brownsville, Brooklyn, and the Plaza Mayor in Lima, Peru; a copy of the "Three Graces Fountain" from Arden House installed in Mirror Lake at Forest Lawn Cemetery, Buffalo (where he is buried); and the controversial figure of a nude woman called "The Pagan." Perhaps his most celebrated work is the 1916 frieze on Carrère and Hastings' Manhattan Bridge in New York City, titled "Buffalo Hunt."

=== Service in World War I and later life ===
During World War I, Rumsey served as a captain with Headquarters Troop, 77th Infantry Division and Fortieth Engineers, United States Army Corps of Engineers. His brother, Laurence Dana Rumsey, Jr. (1885–1967), was a pilot in the War with the famous Lafayette Escadrille and Lafayette Flying Corps.

His work was part of the sculpture event in the art competition at the 1928 Summer Olympics.

== Personal life ==
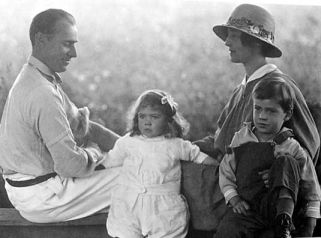
Rumsey with his wife and children

In 1910, Rumsey married Mary Harriman (1881–1934), the founder of The Junior League for the Promotion of Settlement Movements, later known as the Junior League of the City of New York of the Association of Junior Leagues International Inc. Mary was the daughter of railroad magnate E.H. Harriman and sister to W. Averell Harriman, former New York state governor and United States diplomat. In 2015 she was posthumously inducted into the National Women's Hall of Fame. Together they had three children:

- Charles Cary Rumsey, Jr. (1911–2007),
- Mary Averell Rumsey (b. 1913), who made her debut in 1932 at a party with over 1,100 guests.
- Bronson Harriman Rumsey (1917–1939), who died when the plane he was riding in, along with Daniel S. Roosevelt, hit a mountain slope near Guadalupe Victoria, Puebla, Mexico. Roosevelt was the son of Hall Roosevelt and nephew of Eleanor Roosevelt.

On September 21, 1922, Rumsey was a passenger in an automobile that crashed into a stone bridge abutment on the Jericho Turnpike near Floral Park on Long Island. He was thrown from the vehicle and died minutes later from his injuries. He was buried at Forest Lawn Cemetery in Buffalo, New York.

In 2011, Rumsey was posthumously inducted into the Museum of Polo and Hall of Fame.

=== Descendants ===
Through Charles Jr., Rumsey was posthumously a grandfather of three, Charles, Peter, and Celia Cary. In 1976, Charles, a graduate of Phillips Exeter, Harvard College and Harvard Law School, married Martha Zec, daughter of Dr. Branko Zec of Beverly Hills, California, with Pony Duke (the nephew of Doris Duke) as best man. Charles, a lawyer in New York, also lives in Wyoming, where he runs the Wood River Ranch, a dude ranch and outfitter.
