= Seward Cary =

American polo player (1862–1948)

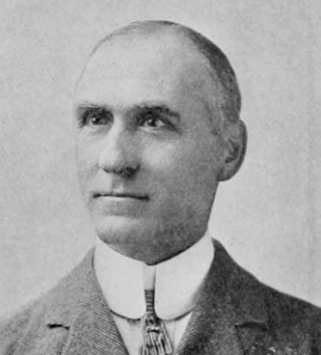
- Born: March 1, 1862; Buffalo, New York, U.S.
- Died: September 5, 1948 (aged 86); Small Point, Maine
- Education: Harvard College; Buffalo Medical College
- Spouse: Emily L. Scatcherd (m. 1887; died 1934)
- Children: 5
- Relatives: George Cary (brother); Trumbull Cary (grandfather); Charles Cary Rumsey (nephew)

Seward Cary (March 1, 1862 – September 5, 1948) was an American polo player from New York State.

== Early life and education ==
Seward Cary was born on March 1, 1862, in Buffalo, New York. He was one of seven children born to prominent Buffalo resident, Dr. Walter Cary and Julia (née Love) Cary. His siblings included: Trumbull Cary; Thomas Cary; Charles Cary (who married Evelyn Rumsey); Jennie Cary (who married Laurence D. Rumsey); Walter Cary Jr., and George Cary.

Cary was the paternal grandson of Trumbull Cary, a New York State Senator and Assemblyman. His maternal grand-uncle was Brig. General George Maltby Love. His nephew through his sister Jennie, was Charles Cary Rumsey, who married Mary Harriman (daughter of millionaire railroad executive E. H. Harriman and Mary Williamson).

Cary attended and graduated from Harvard University. While at Harvard, Cary was credited with bringing polo to the university during the 1880s. He was also a member of Delta Kappa Epsilon (aks The Dickey Club). He attended Buffalo Medical College in the fall of 1886, where he belonged to the college society called the I.C.I.

== Career ==
In February 1887, Cary went into the hardwood lumber business with Scatcherd & Son in Buffalo, "one of the largest hardwood lumber concerns in the country".

Cary played polo for 58 consecutive seasons, winning the W. H. Andrews Cup.

== Personal life ==
Cary had an early relationship with Mabel Ganson (who later became a well-known patron of the arts) and her first marriage to Karl Evans was said to be inspired by his resemblance to Cary. On July 13, 1887, he married Emily Lisle Scatcherd Cary (1862–1934), a daughter of James Newton Scatcherd and Anne (née Belton) Scatcherd. Together they had a home in East Hempstead on Long Island and an apartment at 44 East 81st Street in Manhattan and were the parents of:

- Phoebe Cary (1890–1967), who married newspaper editor Arthur Brisbane, a son of utopian socialist Albert Brisbane, in 1912.
- Trumbull Cary (1893–1921)
- John Scatcherd Cary (1898–1921)
- Jane Cary (1899–1903), who died young.
- Elinor Cary (1888–1965), (Note: Her portrait was painted by Adolfo Müller-Ury in 1910.) who married film executive Courtland Smith, a son of Orlando J. Smith, in 1912. They divorced and Smith remarried to Mary Stuart Kernochan (a daughter of J. Frederic Kernochan).

He became a member of the Buffalo Club, the Saturn Club, and the Genesee Valley Hunt Club.

After his wife's death, he moved to 277 Park Avenue, an apartment building designed by McKim, Mead, and White. Cary died while on vacation at Small Point, Maine, on September 5, 1948. He was buried at Forest Lawn Cemetery in Buffalo.
