= Hurley Burley =

American-bred Thoroughbred racehorse

- Sire: Riley
- Grandsire: Longfellow
- Dam: Helter Skelter
- Damsire: Pell Mell
- Sex: Filly
- Foaled: 1895
- Country: United States
- Color: Chestnut
- Breeder: Edward C. Corrigan
- Owner: Edward C. Corrigan; Sam Hildreth
- Trainer: Sam Hildreth
- Record: Unknown
- Earnings: Unknown

Honors
- Weber & Fields musical named after her. They also named one after her dam, Helter Skelter.
- Last updated on January 20, 2008

Hurley Burley (born 1895) was an American Thoroughbred race horse. Her breeder and owner, Edward Corrigan, raced out of Washington Park Race Track in Chicago, Illinois. Known as the "stormy petrel" of the American Turf, he was one of the most powerful men in Midwestern racing. Corrigan campaigned the great filly Modesty, winner of the 1884 Kentucky Oaks, as well as building Hawthorne Race Course near Chicago.

Hurley Burley was birthed by Riley, who had won the 1890 Kentucky Derby for Corrigan and was a son of the great stallion, Longfellow. (Riley was originally called "Shortfellow.") Her dam was Helter Skelter, a racing mare also running under Corrigan's colors.

Corrigan raced Hurley Burley as a selling plater, meaning she competed only in claiming races. As a claimer, she could be bought by a trainer right out of the race. In 1898, Corrigan claimed a horse, Lucky Dog, the Hall of Fame trainer Sam Hildreth was running. Miffed at the loss, Hildreth retaliated by claiming Corrigan's Hurley Burley for $1,500.

Under Hildreth's colors, Hurley Burley stepped up in class in the racing world. She won nine of her 13 starts for him, set a Washington Park track record for six furlongs and also one for one mile and twenty yards.

Lew Fields and his theatrical partner, Joe Weber, asked Hildreth if they could use it for a new musical. They also used the name of her dam, Helter Skelter.

When she retired from the track, Hildreth sold Hurley Burley for $10,000 to William Collins Whitney. As a broodmare, she was as good as she was a racehorse. Her best foal was the 1906 Belmont Stakes winner, Burgomaster, by the Whitney-owned stallion, Hamburg. He was also the American Horse of the Year in 1906.
