= Arthur Lincoln Benedict =

American physician and writer

- Born: August 25, 1865; Buffalo, New York
- Died: January 14, 1950 (aged 84); Buffalo, New York
- Education: University of Michigan
- Occupations: Physician, Writer

Arthur Lincoln Benedict (August 25, 1865 – January 14, 1950) was an American physician and writer.

== Early life and education ==
Benedict was born in Buffalo, New York. He graduated from the University of Michigan. He obtained his M.D. from University of Buffalo in 1888 and from the University of Pennsylvania in 1889. In 1891, he received his A.M. from Ohio Wesleyan University. He married Vida Grenville Meister.

== Career ==
He was Superintendent of Ethnology for the Pan-American Exposition at Buffalo during 1900-1901. He was a member of the American Medical Association. He edited the Buffalo Medical Journal from 1911 to 1918 and during World War I attained the rank of Major in the Medical Corps. Benedict was an amateur ethnologist whose excavations at Native American sites in western New York led to published articles. Benedict amassed a large collection of artifacts such as arrow points, spear points, and other tools to secure ethnology exhibits.

== Legacy ==
Benedict was a member of the Buffalo Historical Society for 51 years and on its board of managers for 6 years. Benedict was a founding member of the American Gastroenterological Association.

== Death ==
He died on January 14, 1950, from a heart attack while making a professional call.

== Selected publications ==
- Practical Dietetics (1904)
- Golden Rules of Dietetics (1908)
- Common Forms of Indigestion (1915)
