= American Press Association =

News press organization in the US

The American Press Association is a self-regulated non-governmental news press organization that is considered the oldest news press agency in the United States.

== History ==
In 1882, (Note: According to Richard Allen Schwarzlose in his 1989 book published by Northwestern University Press, the APA newsbrokerage formed in 1870 (which had agreements with the Atlantic and Pacific Telegraph Company in June 1870) was reorganized as the National Associated Press Company in the fall of 1876.) the American Press Association was founded in Chicago by Maj. Orlando J. Smith, a Civil War veteran and American philosopher and former editor of the Terre Haute Mail, the owner and editor of the Terre Haute Express which he moved to Chicago in 1878 and renamed the Chicago Express. Shortly after its founding, the Association relocated to New York City, with offices at 32 Vesey Street. In 1891, Smith began syndicating humorist Edgar Wilson Nye's work, leading him to become the "most widely read and highly paid writer in the United States" at the time of Nye's death in 1896. At the time of his death in 1908, the Association was "the largest newspaper syndicate in the United States." Smith's son, Courtland Smith, succeeded him as president of the organization. In February 1909, Dr. Albert Shaw wrote about Smith and the American Press Association in The American Review of Reviews stating:

"The greatest single educational influence of the United States is the country newspaper. And more than other man Major Smith made it possible for country newspapers to provide their readers with a fresh and accurate statement of the news of the world at large, of the country as a whole, and of their State or section, while also enabling them to keep abreast of progress in science, art, literature, and all things humanizing and progressive. He perceived with great clearness the opportunity for cooperative effort in the careful editing and economical production of newspapers: and he was able to give effect to his ideas so successfully as to have made him one of the great leaders in the fireside education of the masses of the plain people of America, most of whom still live in villages or upon farms."

In 1911, the Association took out a long-term lease on a new a 150-foot, 12-story Neo-Classical office building at 225 West 39th Street. The building, which cost $300,000, was designed by Mulliken & Moeller and built for the Land and Realty Company to replace "the vacant building of the old Second Reformed Presbyterian church, at 225 West Thirty-ninth street, adjoining the Roman Catholic Orphan Asylum", and thereafter became known as the American Press Association Building.

Bankruptcy 1917 — The American Press Association, a West Virginia corporation organized in 1906 as a subsidiary of the New York association, filed a voluntary petition for bankruptcy on December 3, 1917, in the New York federal court. It stated liabilities at approximately $1,164,800 and assets at $9,026.

== See also ==
- Inter-American Press Association
