= 1890 Kentucky Derby =

Horse race

16th Kentucky Derby
- Kentucky Derby
- Grade I stakes race
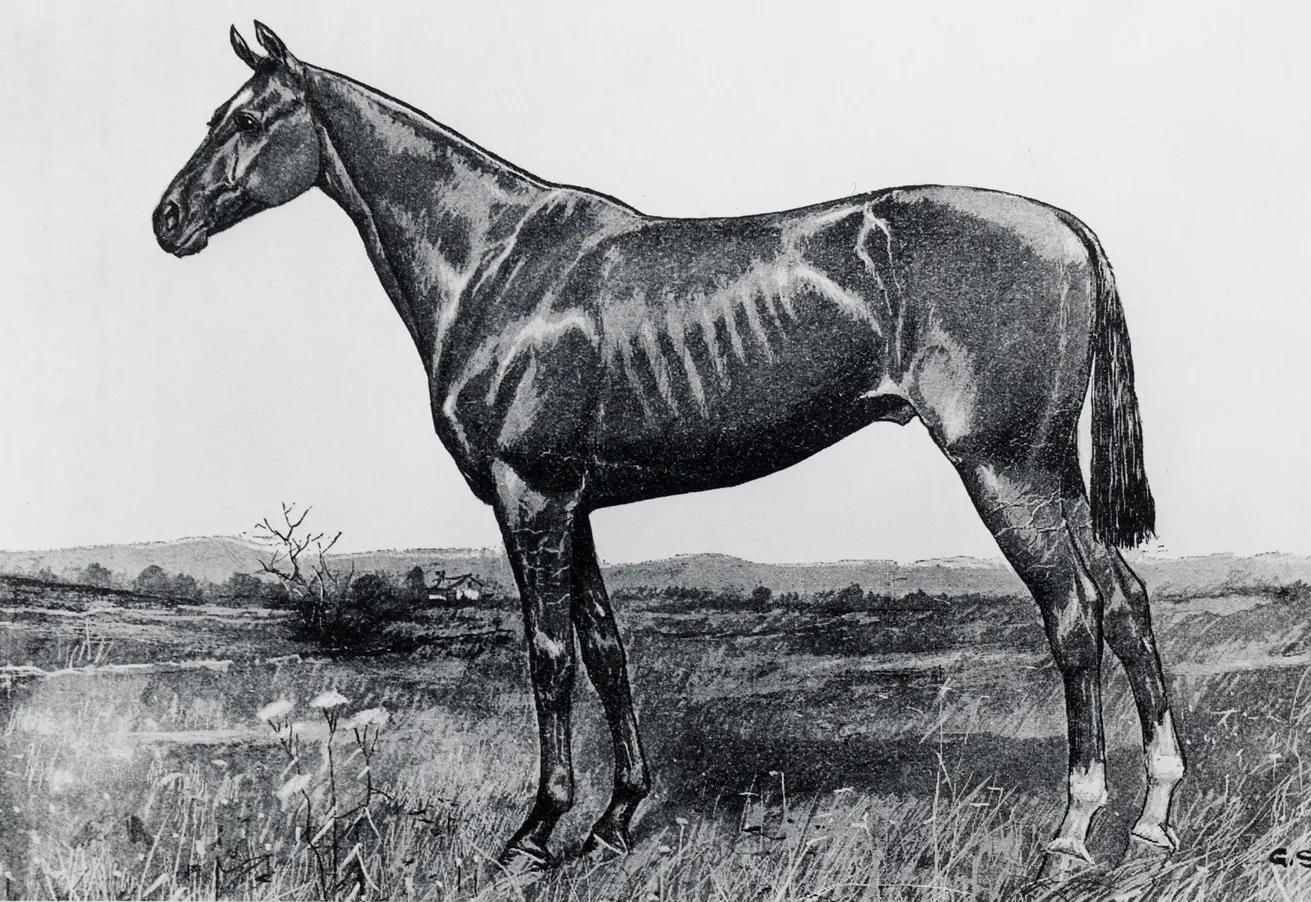
- Riley, winner of the 1889 Kentucky Derby
- Location: Churchill Downs
- Date: May 14, 1890
- Winning horse: Riley
- Jockey: Isaac Burns Murphy
- Trainer: Edward C. Corrigan
- Owner: Edward C. Corrigan
- Surface: Dirt

The 1890 Kentucky Derby was the 16th running of the Kentucky Derby. The race took place on May 14, 1890.

== Full results ==
Finished	Post	Horse	Jockey	Trainer	Owner	Time / behind
1st		Riley	Isaac Murphy	Edward C. Corrigan	Edward C. Corrigan	2:45.00
2nd		Bill Letcher	Alonzo Allen		W. R. Letcher	1 3/4
3rd		Robespierre	S. Francis		George V. Hankins	2
4th		Palisade	Tommy Britton		S. Williams	1
5th		Outlook	Breckinridge		B. J. Treacy	1/2
6th		Prince Fonso	Monk Overton		J. C. Twymann & Co.	

== Payout ==
- The winner received a purse of $5,460.
- Second place received $300.
- Third place received $150.
