= Riley (horse) =

American-bred Thoroughbred racehorse

- Sire: Longfellow
- Grandsire: Leamington
- Dam: Geneva
- Damsire: War Dance
- Sex: Stallion
- Foaled: 1887
- Country: United States
- Colour: Bay
- Breeder: C. H. Durkee
- Owner: Edward C. Corrigan
- Trainer: Edward C. Corrigan
- Record: 64: 30-17-4
- Earnings: $43,430

Major wins
- Railway Stakes (1889); Trial Stakes (1889); Merchants' Stakes (1889); Clark Handicap (1890); Speculation Handicap (1890); Fairwiew Lightweight Handicap (1890); Pelham Bay Handicap (1890); Monmouth Cup (1891); Shrewsbury Handicap (1891); Coney Island Cup (1891); Bay Ridge Handicap (1891); Free Lightweight Handicap (1891); Brooklyn Cup (1891); Montgomery Stakes (1891) American Classics wins: Kentucky Derby (1890)

Riley (1887 – July 1, 1910) was a bay colt sired by Longfellow out of Geneva. He won the 1890 Kentucky Derby for owner and trainer Edward Corrigan who shortly after would build Hawthorne Race Course which opened in Cicero, Illinois, in 1891. Ridden by future U.S. Racing Hall of Fame inductee Isaac Murphy, Riley won the mile and one-quarter Derby in 2 minutes 45 seconds, the slowest time recorded to that point due to a very muddy track. Riley was originally named Shortfellow and had a relatively long and successful career in which he had 64 starts with 30 wins, 17 places, and 4 shows.

Riley died on July 1, 1910, at the age of 23 while being cared for by a racehorse rescue association.

Riley's only offspring of note was his daughter, Hurley Burley, who was the dam of Burgomaster, a successful sire.

== Pedigree ==
Pedigree of Riley
Sire Longfellow 1867	Leamington 1853	Faugh-a-Ballagh	Sir Hercules
Sire Longfellow 1867	Leamington 1853	Faugh-a-Ballagh	Guiccioli
Sire Longfellow 1867	Leamington 1853	Pantaloon Mare	Pantaloon
Sire Longfellow 1867	Leamington 1853	Pantaloon Mare	Daphne
Sire Longfellow 1867	Nantura 1855	Brawner's Eclipse	American Eclipse
Sire Longfellow 1867	Nantura 1855	Brawner's Eclipse	Henry Mare
Sire Longfellow 1867	Nantura 1855	Quiz	Bertrand
Sire Longfellow 1867	Nantura 1855	Quiz	Lady Fortune
Dam Geneva 1880	War Dance 1859	Lexington*	Boston*
Dam Geneva 1880	War Dance 1859	Lexington*	Alice Carneal*
Dam Geneva 1880	War Dance 1859	Reel	Glencoe I
Dam Geneva 1880	War Dance 1859	Reel	Gallopade
Dam Geneva 1880	La Gitana 1869	Uncle Vic	Lexington*
Dam Geneva 1880	La Gitana 1869	Uncle Vic	Undine
Dam Geneva 1880	La Gitana 1869	Georgia Wood	Knight of St. George
Dam Geneva 1880	La Gitana 1869	Georgia Wood	Margaret Wood

* Riley is inbred 3D x 4D to the stallion Lexington, meaning that he appears third generation and fourth generation on the dam side of his pedigree.
