= George Cary (architect) =

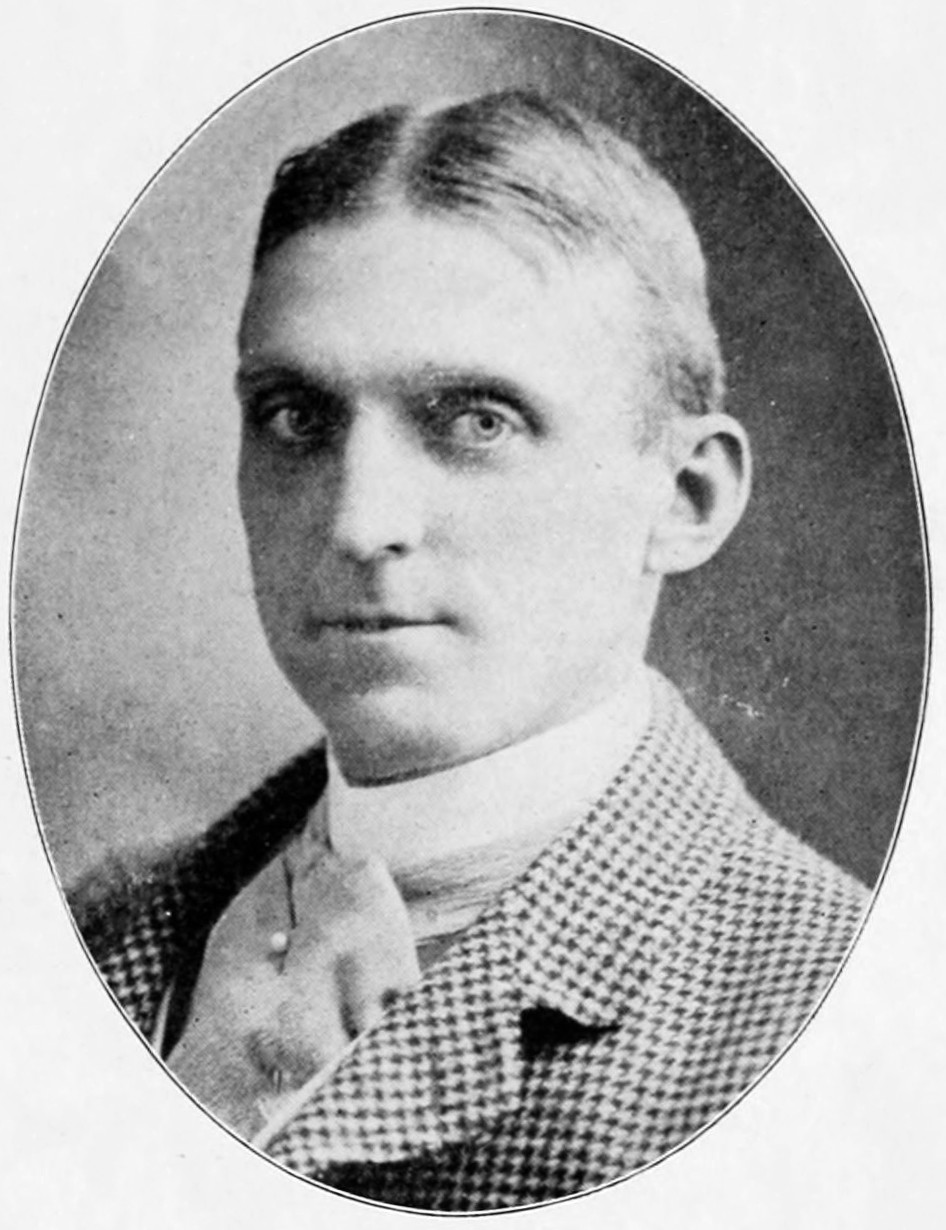
- Cary in 1902
- Born: 1859
- Died: May 5, 1945 (aged 86); Buffalo, New York, U.S.
- Education: Harvard College (1883); Columbia University; L'Ecole des Beaux-Arts
- Occupation: Architect
- Spouse: Allithea Birge (m. 1908; died 1918)
- Children: 4
- Relatives: Seward Cary (brother); Trumbull Cary (grandfather); Charles Cary Rumsey (nephew)
- Practice: McKim, Mead and White
- Buildings: Buffalo History Museum; Ethnology Building

George Cary (1859 – May 5, 1945), was a major American architect from New York State known for his designs for the Pan-American Exposition of 1901 in Buffalo, New York.

== Early life and education ==
George Cary was born in 1859. He was one of seven children born to prominent Buffalo resident, Dr. Walter Cary (1818–1881) and Julia Cary (née Love). His siblings included: Trumbull Cary; Thomas Cary; Charles Cary, who in 1879 married Evelyn Rumsey; Jennie Cary, who married Laurence D. Rumsey; Walter Cary Jr.; and Seward Cary. His nephew through his sister Jennie, was Charles Cary Rumsey (1879–1922), who married Mary Harriman, daughter of millionaire railroad executive E. H. Harriman and Mary Williamson.

Cary was the paternal grandson of Trumbull Cary (1787–1869), a New York State Senator and Assemblyman. His maternal grand-uncle was Brig. General George Maltby Love.

== Career ==
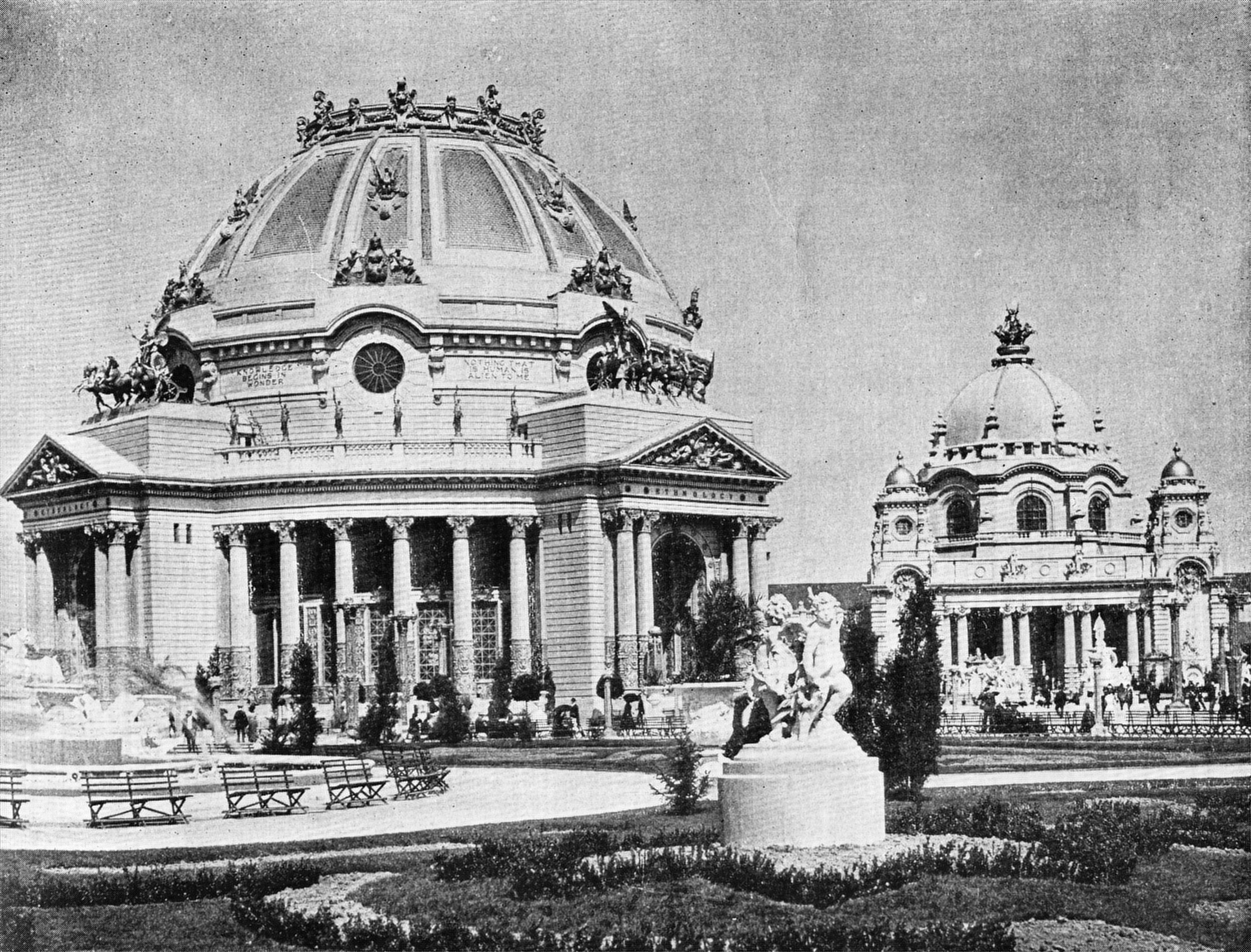
Ethnology Building

Cary attended and graduated from Harvard and the Columbia School of Architecture. After graduating from Columbia, Cary spent a brief apprenticeship with McKim, Mead and White in New York City. Directly after that, he went to Paris and studied at the L'Ecole des Beaux-Arts from 1886 until 1889, the first Buffalonian to do so.

In 1891, he returned to Buffalo and set up practice. In the mid-1890s, Cary redesigned some rooms in the Ansley Wilcox House, which later became known as Theodore Roosevelt Inaugural National Historic Site as it was the site where Theodore Roosevelt took the oath of office as President of the United States on September 14, 1901, after the assassination of William McKinley at the Pan-American Exposition of 1901.

When the Exposition came to Buffalo, Cary became one of the three local architects on the Board of Architects for the Exposition and designed the Ethnology Building and the New York State pavilion for the Pan-American Exposition. The pavilion was the only permanent building created for the Exposition and later became the Buffalo Historical Society, then the Buffalo and Erie County Historical Society, and today is the Buffalo History Museum.

=== Notable projects ===
- Wadsworth House (1900)
- Buffalo History Museum (1901)
- Ethnology Building (1901)
- Pierce-Arrow Motor Car Company Administration Building (1906–1907)
- Buffalo General Hospital
- University at Buffalo buildings
- Buffalo Country Club
- Forest Lawn's Delaware Avenue Gate (Neoclassical)
- Forest Lawn Administration Building (Neoclassical)

== Personal life ==
In 1908, he married Allithea Birge, daughter of George K. Birge and Carrie Birge (Birge wallpaper and Pierce-Arrow cars). Cary designed features on their home at 460 Franklin Street in the Italianate style. Together they had:

- George Cary, Jr. (1911–1971), who married in Marguerite Warren, a descendant of the Brevoort family, in 1934.
- Allithea M. B. Cary (1913–1993), who married Francis E. Lango (1915–1969).
- Maria Love Cary (1915–2009), who married Howard Bissell, Jr. (b. 1913), the nephew of Wilson S. Bissell, in 1936.
- Charles Cary (1916–1985), who married Rhoda Gordon Coogan, the granddaughter of Dr. Henry Fairfield Osborn, in 1947.

Cary was a founder of the Beaux-Arts Institute of Design, served as president of the American Institute of Architects, of which he was a member for 53 years, a director of the Albright Art Gallery, member of the Fine Arts Academy.

Allithea died in 1918 and he died in 1945, at eighty-six. Both are buried in Forest Lawn Cemetery in Buffalo.

=== Philanthropy ===
In 1937, Cary donated what was then a 120 year old early American home to the city of Batavia, New York, for its restoration and preservation as an example of early American architecture. The city ultimately returned the donation stating that they could not use taxpayer dollars to fund and pay for the upkeep of the residence.

== Gallery ==
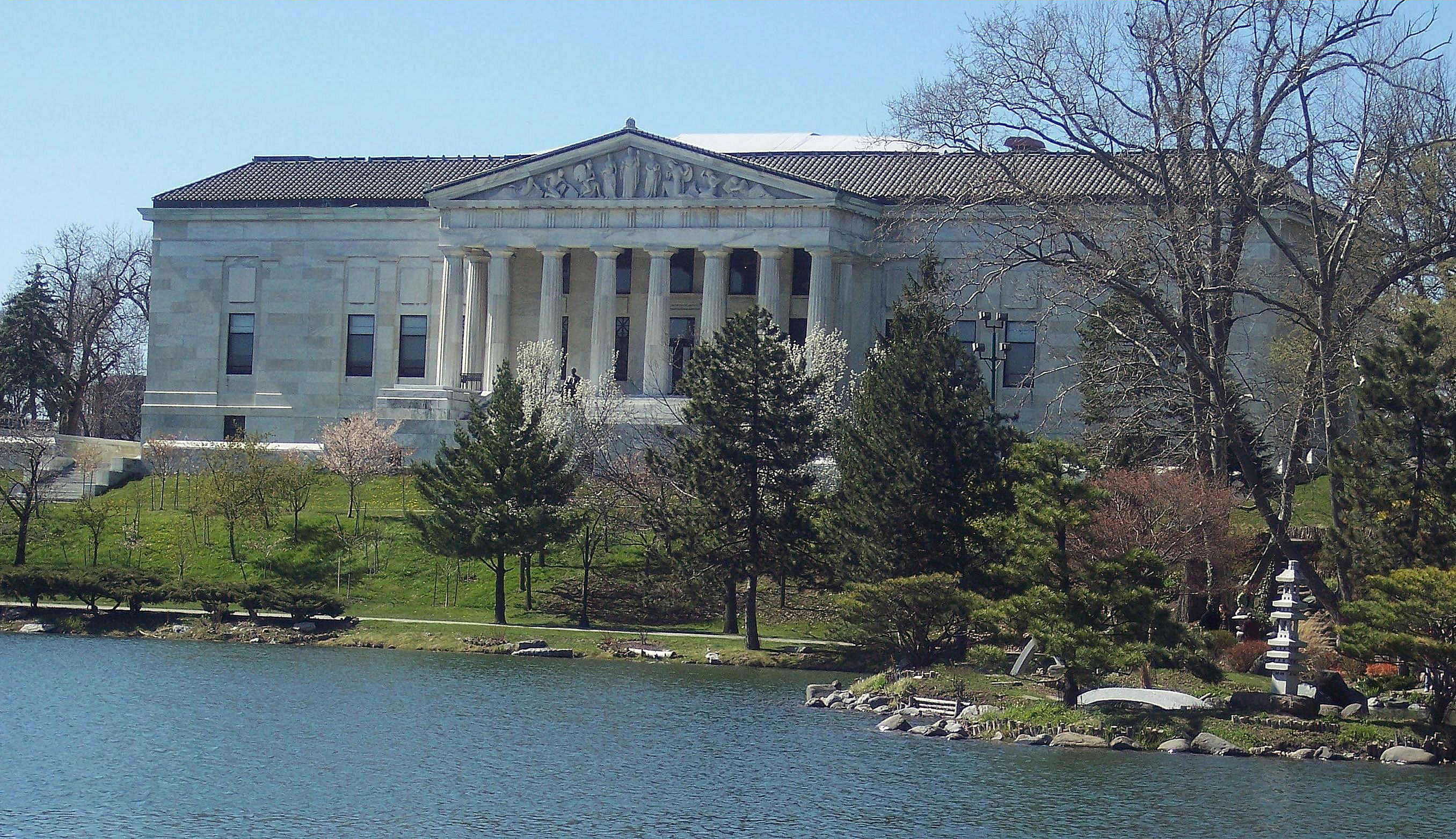
Buffalo History Museum

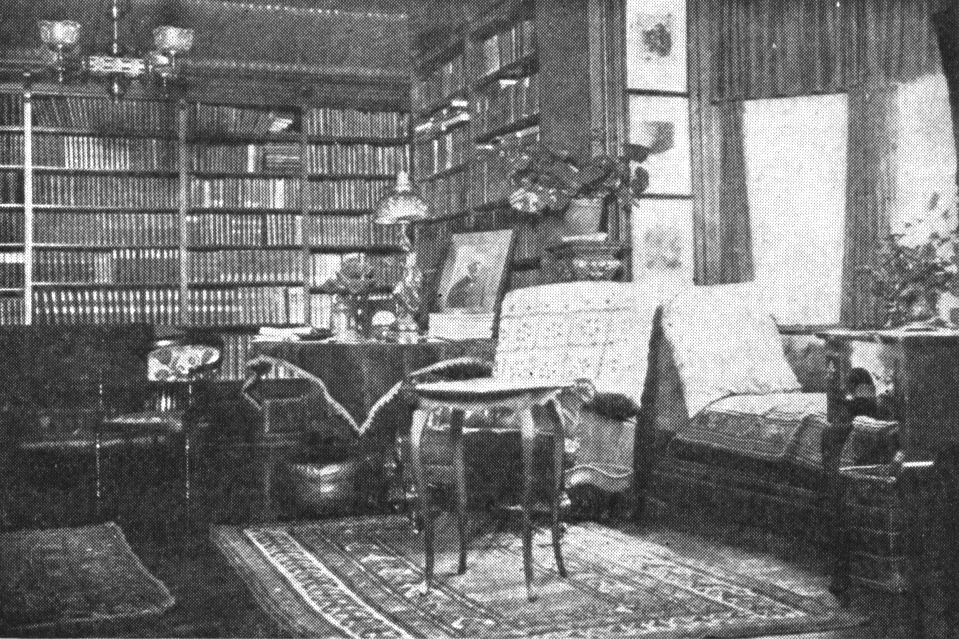
Interior of room in Wilcox House where Theodore Roosevelt took the oath of Presidency

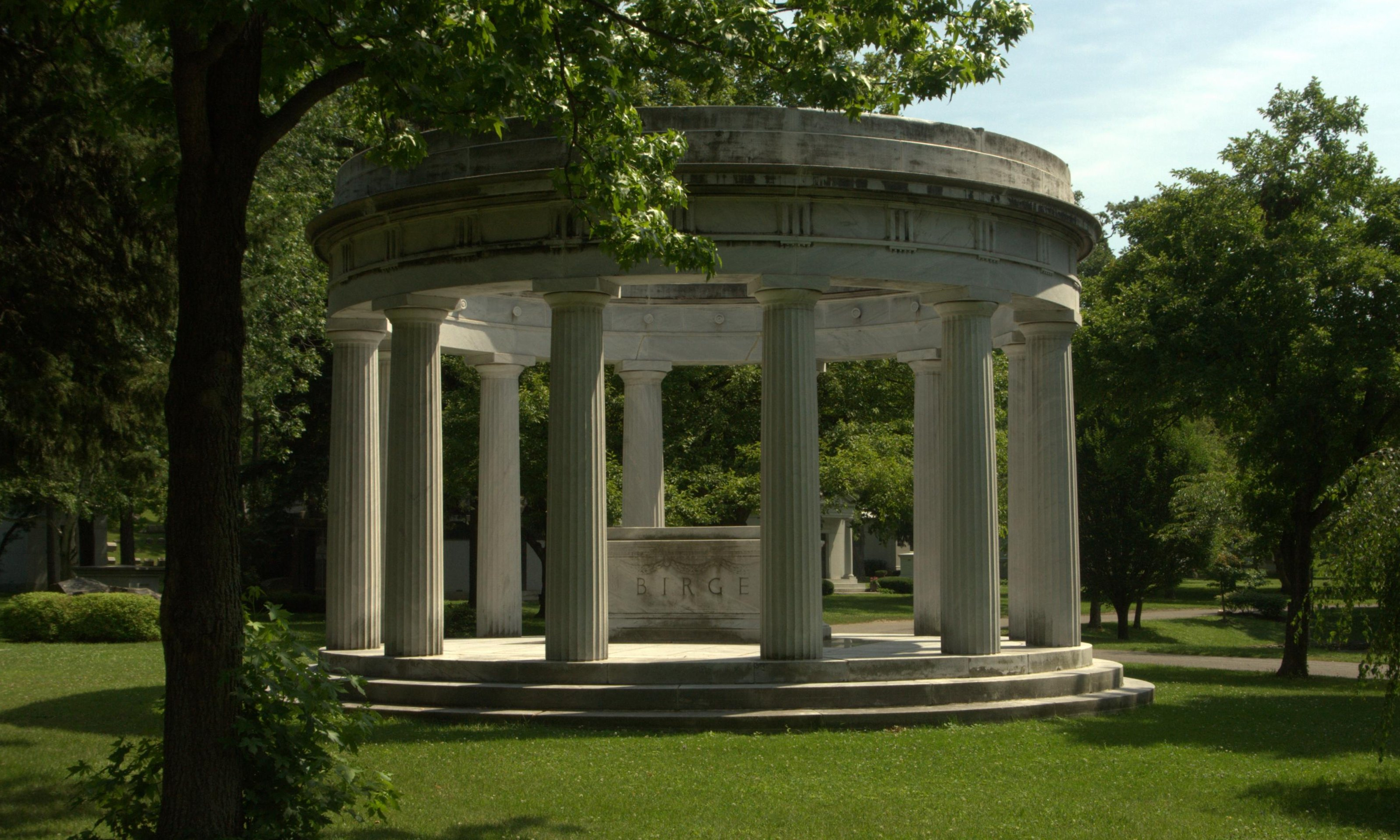
The Birge Memorial for George K. Birge, president of the Pierce-Arrow Motor Car Company.
