= Burgomaster (horse) =

American thoroughbred racehorse

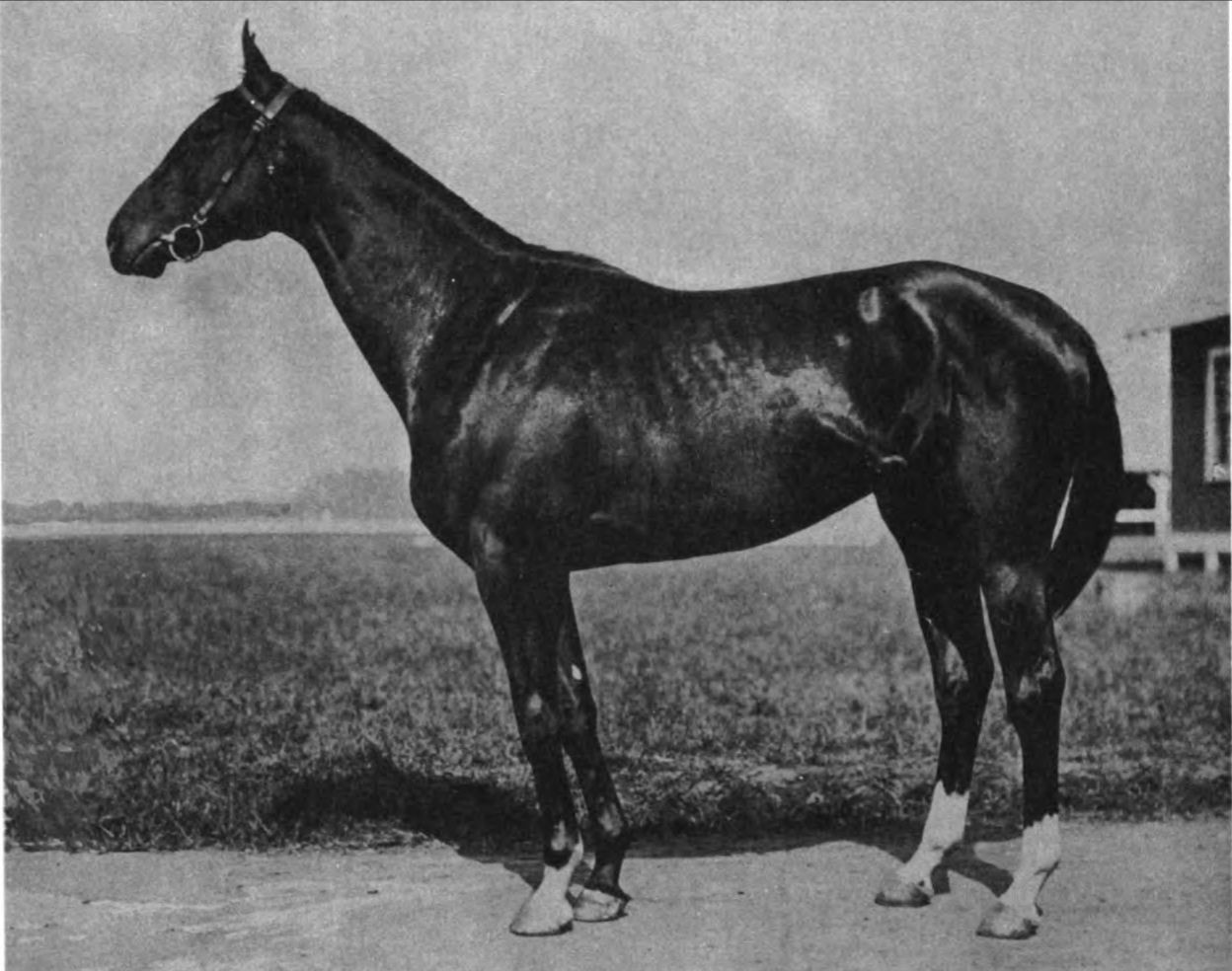
- Burgomaster in 1903
- Sire: Hamburg
- Grandsire: Hanover
- Dam: Hurley Burley
- Damsire: Riley
- Sex: Colt
- Foaled: 1903
- Country: United States
- Color: Brown
- Breeder: Harry Payne Whitney
- Owner: Harry Payne Whitney
- Trainer: John W. Rogers

Major wins
- Flash Stakes (1905); Great American Stakes (1905); Great Eastern Handicap (1905); Matron Stakes (1905); United States Hotel Stakes (1905); Carlton Stakes (1906) Triple Crown Race wins: Belmont Stakes (1906)

Awards
- American Horse of the Year (1906)

Burgomaster (foaled 1903) was an American Thoroughbred racehorse who won the 1906 Belmont Stakes.

== Background ==
A colt, Burgomaster's sire was Hamburg and his dam was Hurley Burley. Burgomaster was bred by H. P. Whitney of the prominent Whitney family, who were very involved in and successful with racehorse breeding. J. W. Rogers was Burgomaster's trainer.

== Horse racing career ==
In May 1906, Burgomaster won the Carlton Stakes. Later in the year, Burgomaster won the Belmont Stakes with a time of 2:20 and Lucien Lyne as the jockey. Burgomaster was the 1906 Horse of the Year, becoming the first of four horses bred by Whitney to win the honor.

In 1907, Burgomaster was eliminated from competing in the Suburban Handicap, "having been pronounced too unsound to continue in training" for the race.
