= Stephen Whitney =

American merchant (1776–1860)

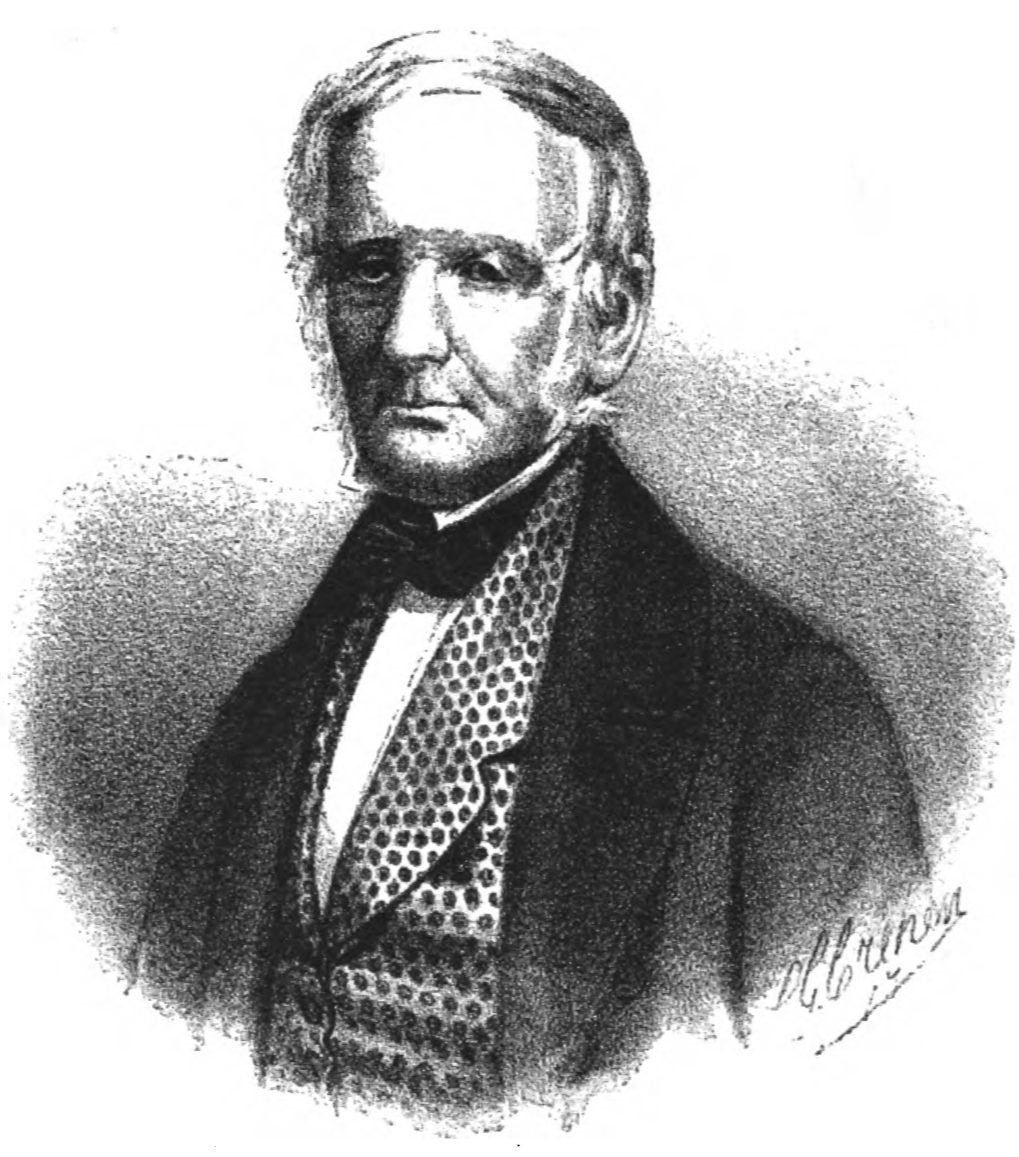
- Born: September 4, 1776; Derby, Connecticut, US
- Died: February 16, 1860 (aged 83); New York City, US
- Occupation: Merchant
- Spouse: Harriet Suydam (1803–1860)

Stephen Whitney (September 4, 1776 – February 16, 1860) was an American merchant. He was one of the wealthiest merchants in New York City in the first half of the 19th century. His fortune was considered second only to that of John Jacob Astor. As a prominent citizen of the rapidly growing city, he helped to build some of its institutions, including the Merchants' Exchange Building, the first permanent home of the New York Stock Exchange.

== Early life ==
Stephen Whitney was born in humble circumstances in Derby, Connecticut, on September 4, 1776. He was a son of Captain Henry Whitney (1735–1811) and Eunice (née Clark) Whitney (1746–1794), a daughter of William Clark and Hannah Peck Clark. His brother, Archibald Whitney, was married to Nancy Ann Brower.

He was a descendant of Henry Whitney who immigrated to southern Connecticut in the mid-seventeenth century.

== Career ==
Whitney moved to New York City in his early twenties, taking a job in his brother Henry's business firm Lawrence & Whitney. By 1800, Whitney had accumulated enough capital to go into business as a grocer and an importer of wine and spirits on his own, at first in partnership with a Scotsman named John Currie.

=== War of 1812 ===
During the War of 1812, American cotton had become almost worthless due to an embargo on exports. Whitney arranged through agents to accept cotton as payment for debts owed him in the South. He was able to export some of that cotton during the war through Amelia Island in northern Florida, at the time still part of neutral Spain. When the war ended in 1815, he owned warehouses full of cotton. He is also reported to have purchased all the cotton bales used to build fortifications by Andrew Jackson's army during the Battle of New Orleans. When the embargo was lifted, the US price of cotton shot up, and he became a wealthy man. By 1818, he was able to retire from commerce.

=== Later life ===
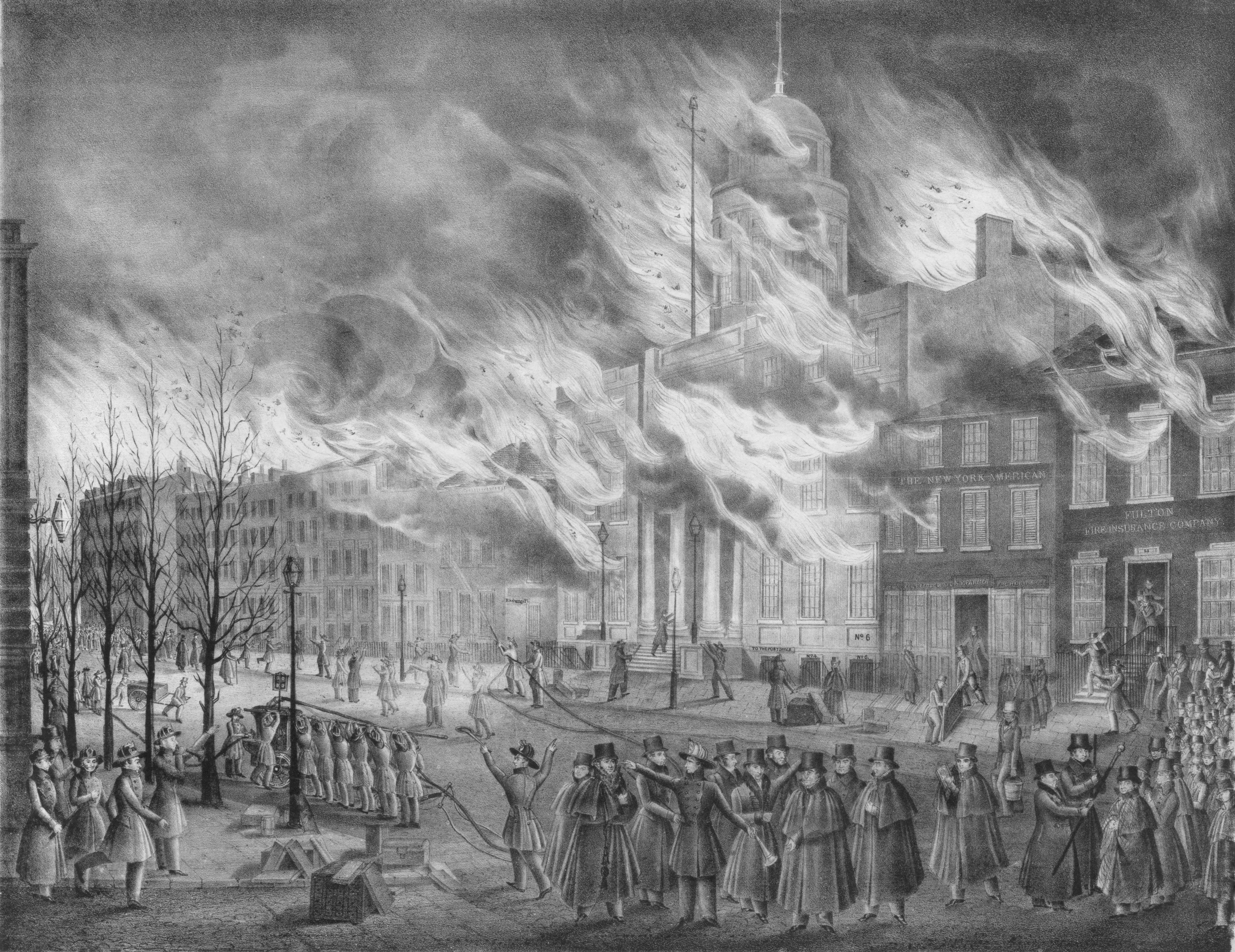
The Merchants' Exchange Building burning in 1835

Whitney turned his attention to investing his fortune. He bought up real estate in the city, especially in the area around Pearl Street and lower Manhattan. He was a director of both the National Bank of Commerce in New York, of which he was a founder in 1839, and the Bank of America. He invested in shipping, including the China trade and the Robert Kermit Red Star Line of packets. One of the Kermit Line vessels was named for him (the ship Stephen Whitney). Other interests were insurance, canals, and the new railroads (he was a director of the New Jersey Rail Road).

In 1827, he joined William Backhouse Astor, son of John Jacob Astor, in building a Merchants' Exchange Building at the corner of Wall and William Streets. The New York Stock and Exchange Board moved their operations from the Tontine Coffee House to the new building, adopting it as their first permanent home. In the 1840s, he was involved in the founding of Green-Wood Cemetery in Brooklyn.

Much of lower Manhattan was destroyed in a disastrous fire in December 1835. The Merchants Stock and Exchange Building was one of the losses (a new building, the second building of that name, was built on the site and still stands today). Stephen Whitney was one of the many prominent citizens who served on the committee to help the city rebuild.

Two years later, he managed to make a huge profit from the Panic of 1837. He bought up commercial paper during the panic, and held it until it had rebounded. This greatly increased his wealth, making him a millionaire.

Politically, Whitney was an "Old-Line Whig", and like many New Yorkers he was a supporter of Henry Clay. In 1852 Whitney was one of the leaders in organizing the City Reform League, which spearheaded a movement to wrest some of the power away from corrupt city aldermen.

== Personal life ==
In 1803, when he was 26 years old, he married Harriet Suydam (1782–1860), the sister of his brother's wife. Together, they were the parents of:

- Samuel Suydam Whitney (1804–1858), who died unmarried.
- Emeline Whitney (1806-1897), who married John Dore.
- John Currie Whitney (1808–1808), who died in infancy.
- Mary Whitney (1810–1876), who married Jonas Phillips Phoenix, a merchant and U.S. Representative.
- Henry Whitney (1812–1856), who married Hannah Eugenia Lawrence (1815–1844) in 1835. After her death, he married Maria Lucy Fitch (1827-1886) in 1850.
- William Whitney (1816–1862), who married Mary Stuart McVickar (1817–1907) in 1843.
- Stephen Whitney (1814–1858), who died unmarried of consumption.
- Edward Whitney (1818–1851), who died unmarried.
- Caroline Whitney (1823–1905), who married Ferdinand Suydam (1816-1872). After his death, she married Dr. John Jacob Crane (1820-1890). Lastly, she married Nathan Adolphus Baldwin (1824-1898), the widower of her brother Henry's widow.

Whitney died at home in Bowling Green on February 16, 1860. An elaborate funeral was held at Trinity Church, after which he was buried at Green-Wood Cemetery in Brooklyn. The executors of his estate later had a marble chapel built at his burial site. Harriet Suydam Whitney died four months later, in May 1860.

=== Residence ===
In 1825, Whitney had a townhouse built at Number 7 Bowling Green, at the corner of State Street and Broadway—the current site of the old Custom House that is now home to the Heye Indian Museum. The seven houses in the block, which faced across Bowling Green and straight up Broadway, were among the most fashionable in the city when they were built. However, as the city quickly evolved, wealthy residents began to move "uptown" to Washington Square and Fifth Avenue. Stephen Whitney, who was famous for refusing to bend to fashion, was still living at 7 Bowling Green when he died, even though the neighborhood had become somewhat run down and all of his peers had moved away. The contents of the Whitney living room at 7 Bowling Green have been on permanent display at the Museum of the City of New York since 1936.

=== Wealth ===
Whitney was among the first multi-millionaires in the city. Many accounts refer to his fortune as second only to that of John Jacob Astor, who died in 1848 with an estate of $20 million (~$585 million in 2024). Whitney's wealth was estimated at his death to be at least $8 million, although some thought it was $10 or even $15 million. Unlike the Astors, he was not given to public philanthropy, and the result is that the Whitney name is not remembered in the city the way that the Astor name is.

=== Descendants ===
Through his son William, he was a grandfather of Mary Stuart Whitney (1849–1922), who married attorney J. Frederic Kernochan, brother of businessman James Powell Kernochan.

Also through his son William, he was a great-grandfather of Mary Stuart Whitney who married Robert Livingston Stevens, son of Edwin Augustus Stevens. Their son, Robert Livingston Stevens Jr. married Grace Vanderbilt Davis, daughter of Brig. General Cornelius and Grace Vanderbilt.
