= Hamburg (horse) =

American-bred Thoroughbred racehorse

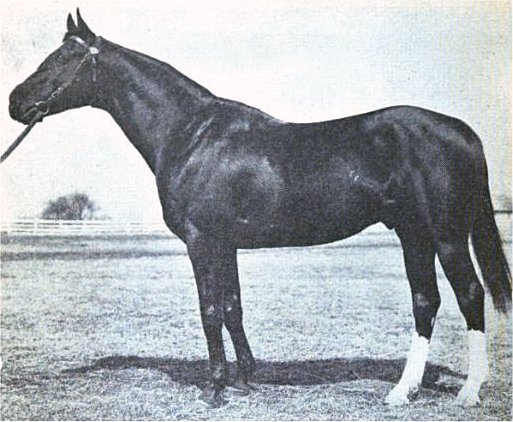
- c. 1911
- Sire: Hanover
- Grandsire: Hindoo
- Dam: Lady Reel
- Damsire: Fellowcraft
- Sex: Stallion
- Foaled: 1895
- Country: United States
- Color: Bay
- Breeder: Cornelius J. Enright
- Owner: Cornelius J. Enright; John E. Madden; Marcus Daly; William Collins Whitney; Harry Payne Whitney
- Trainer: John E. Madden; William Lakeland
- Record: 21 Starts: 16-3–2
- Earnings: $60,380

Major wins
- Double Event Stakes (part2) (1897); Flash Stakes (1897); Great Eastern Handicap (1897); Great Trial Stakes (1897); Swift Stakes (1897); Brighton Cup (1898); Lawrence Realization Stakes (1898)

Awards
- American Champion Two-Year-Old Colt (1897); American Horse of the Year (1898); Leading sire in North America (1905)

Honors
- U.S. Racing Hall of Fame (1986)
- Last updated on December 26, 2007

Hamburg (1895–1915) was an American Thoroughbred race horse. The leading American colt of his generation, Hamburg was retrospectively named the American Horse of the Year for 1898. After his racing career he went on to be a successful sire.

== Background ==
Hamburg was bred in Kentucky by Cornelius J. Enright at his Elmendorf Farm. Hamburg's sire was the great Hanover by another great, Hindoo. Hamburg's dam Lady Reel was descended from Gallopade, a British broodmare who was exported to Canada in the 1830s and became the female-line ancestor of numerous major winners in North America. Enright had acquired Lady Reel from James E. Kittson, brother to Norman W. Kittson who had been partners in Erdenheim Stud.

In 1897, Hamburg was purchased for $1,200 by the Hall of Fame trainer John E. Madden who raced him as a two-year-old. Madden said he was the hardest colt he'd ever trained. But once "tamed," he was quick to exercise and very eager to eat.

== Racing career ==
At two, Hamburg carried 129 pounds in the Double Event, Flash, and Autumn Stakes, 132 in the Electric Handicap, 134 pounds in the Congress Hall, and in the Great Eastern, he was loaded with 135 pounds. Some of his better rivals carried almost as much, but these weights were, and remain, very high, especially for a juvenile horse. On the Hall of Fame site, it states that Hamburg “carried the highest weights ever by a juvenile.”

Hamburg was so eager to race, his rapid breaks often caused the official starter's ability to be questioned. Tod Sloan, the Hall of Fame jockey who rode him and hundreds of other horses, many of whom were highly regarded, said, "Hamburg was the only great horse I ever rode."

In December 1897, Madden sold Hamburg for $40,001 to Marcus Daly, the copper magnate, who turned him over to his trainer, Billy Lakeland. (Even so, Madden thought so much of Hamburg, he named his farm in Lexington, Kentucky, Hamburg Place after him.) Marcus Daly, one of three men known as Montana's Copper Kings, maintained the Bitter Root Stock Farm in Hamilton, Montana, but kept Hamburg in the East at his trainers facilities. At age three, Hamburg won for Daly as he had won for Madden. In the Realization Stakes, he beat Plaudit, the winner of the 1898 Kentucky Derby. In the Brighton Cup, he bested the Brooklyn and Parkway Stakes winner, Howard Mann.

== Retirement ==
When owner Marcus Daly died in 1900, his horses were sold, with Hamburg bringing the highest price: $60,000. William Collins Whitney bought him for stud duty. W. C. Whitney died in 1904 at which point Hamburg was then auctioned, and bought for $70,000 by his son, Harry Payne Whitney.

Hamburg was the Leading sire in North America in 1905. He produced at least 27 stakes winners, including Artful, Dandelion, Burgomaster (out of the mare Hurley Burley), Pegasus, Frizette, and Borrow. He was the damsire of Regret, the first filly to win the Kentucky Derby and of another great filly, Maskette.

Hamburg was inducted into the Hall of Fame in 1986.

Hamburg died in New Jersey on September 10, 1915.

Charles Cary Rumsey, an American sculptor and polo playing friend, was commissioned by Harry Whitney to create a sculpture of Hamburg.

== Sire line tree ==
- Hamburg
  - Inflexible
    - Textile
    - Pluvious
  - Strephon
  - Dandelion
  - Battleaxe
  - Burgomaster
    - Bourgeois
    - Burgoright
    - Glasgow
    - Sebastolbol
    - Portugal
  - Orison
  - Pegasus
  - The Irishman
  - Baby Wolf
  - Hillside
  - Borrow
  - Buskin
  - Prince Eugene
  - Happy Go Lucky

== Pedigree ==
Pedigree of Hamburg (USA), bay stallion, 1895
Sire Hanover (USA) 1884	Hindoo (USA); 1878	Virgil	Vandal*
Sire Hanover (USA) 1884	Hindoo (USA); 1878	Virgil	Hymenia
Sire Hanover (USA) 1884	Hindoo (USA); 1878	Florence	Lexington*
Sire Hanover (USA) 1884	Hindoo (USA); 1878	Florence	Weatherwitch
Sire Hanover (USA) 1884	Bourbon Belle (USA); 1869	Bonnie Scotland	Iago
Sire Hanover (USA) 1884	Bourbon Belle (USA); 1869	Bonnie Scotland	Queen Mary
Sire Hanover (USA) 1884	Bourbon Belle (USA); 1869	Ella D	Vandal*
Sire Hanover (USA) 1884	Bourbon Belle (USA); 1869	Ella D	Falcon
Dam Lady Reel (USA) 1886	Fellowcraft (USA); 1870	Australian	West Australian
Dam Lady Reel (USA) 1886	Fellowcraft (USA); 1870	Australian	Emilia
Dam Lady Reel (USA) 1886	Fellowcraft (USA); 1870	Aerolite	Lexington*
Dam Lady Reel (USA) 1886	Fellowcraft (USA); 1870	Aerolite	Florine
Dam Lady Reel (USA) 1886	Mannie Gray (USA); 1874	Enquirer	Leamington
Dam Lady Reel (USA) 1886	Mannie Gray (USA); 1874	Enquirer	Lida
Dam Lady Reel (USA) 1886	Mannie Gray (USA); 1874	Lizzie G	War Dance
Dam Lady Reel (USA) 1886	Mannie Gray (USA); 1874	Lizzie G	Lecomte mare (Family: 23-b)

* Hamburg is inbred 4S x 4S to the stallion Vandal, meaning that he appears fourth generation twice on the sire side of his pedigree.

* Hamburg is inbred 4S x 4D to the stallion Lexington, meaning that he appears fourth generation on the sire side of his pedigree and fourth generation on the dam side of his pedigree.
