= J. Frederic Kernochan =

American lawyer (1842–1929)

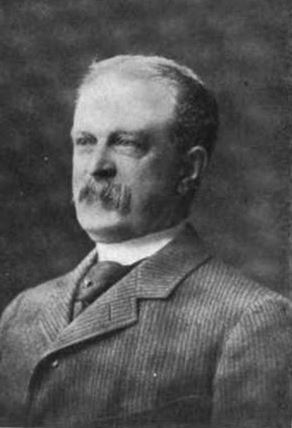
- Born: Joseph Frederic Kernochan; December 8, 1842; New York City, New York, U.S.
- Died: August 17, 1929 (aged 86); New York City, New York, U.S.
- Education: Yale University; Columbia Law School
- Spouse: Mary Stuart Whitney (m. 1869; death 1922)
- Children: 5
- Parent(s): Joseph Kernochan; Margaret Eliza Seymour
- Relatives: James P. Kernochan (brother)

Joseph Frederic Kernochan (December 8, 1842 – August 17, 1929) was an American attorney and socialite who was prominent in New York society during the Gilded Age.

== Early life ==
Kernochan was born on December 8, 1842, in New York City in a house at 8th Street and Second Avenue. He was the son of Joseph Kernochan (1789–1864) and Margaret Eliza (née Seymour) Kernochan (1804–1845). His siblings included William Seymour Kernochan, James Powell Kernochan, Elizabeth Powell Kernochan Garr, John Adams Kernochan, Henry Parish Kernochan, Ann Adams Kernochan, and Frank Edward Kernochan. His father, who was born in Scotland and came to America in 1790 as a baby, was a dry goods merchant and banker that was a founder of the University Club of New York.

His paternal grandparents were William and Esther Kernochan, Scotch-Irish Presbyterians who had a farm in Orange County, and his maternal grandparents were William Seymour and Eliza (née Powell) Seymour, an English family who lived in Brooklyn.

He prepared for college at the Aaron N. Skinner's (former Presidents pro tempore of the Connecticut Senate) school in New Haven, Connecticut, before enrolling, and later graduating, from Yale University with a Bachelor of Arts in 1863. At Yale, he was a member of Alpha Sigma Phi, Delta Kappa Epsilon, Skull and Bones, and Phi Beta Kappa. He then attended and graduated from Columbia Law School with a Bachelor of Laws in 1865, where he was valedictorian of his class.

== Career ==
In May 1865, he was admitted to the bar of the Supreme Court of New York County. After a year spent traveling abroad, he joined the law office of Abraham R. Lawrence in New York City working there from 1867 until 1869. In 1869, he formed a partnership with his brother Frank under firm name of F. E. & J. F. Kernochan in New York, operating until 1873 when decided to stop practicing law. After that point, he practiced independently focusing on testamentary law, dealing with trusts and estates.

From 1898 until 1918, he was president of Arminius Chemical Company, which owned valuable mines in Virginia. He was also a member of the board of directors of Astoria Steel Company. From 1909 to 1929, he served as a director of Lawyers' Title Company and of the Stephen Whitney Estate Company.

=== Society life ===
In 1892, Kernochan and his wife Mary were included in Ward McAllister's "Four Hundred", purported to be an index of New York's best families, published in The New York Times. Conveniently, 400 was the number of people that could fit into Mrs. Astor's ballroom.

From 1893 to 1901, Kernochan was the president of New York Free Circulating Library (which was later absorbed by the New York Public Library) and was a charter member of New York City Bar Association in 1869. He was a warden of All Saint's Memorial Church in Navesink, New Jersey, a member of vestry of Grace Church in New York City.

== Personal life ==
On April 15, 1869, Kernochan was married to Mary Stuart Whitney (1849–1922), the daughter of William and Mary Stuart (née McVickar) Whitney. Her paternal grandparents were merchant Stephen Whitney and Harriet (née Suydam) Whitney. For many years, they lived at 11 East 26th Street, on the north side of Madison Square, until Kernochan and his wife hired the prominent architectural firm of Cross & Cross to build a large five story mansion at 862 Park Avenue (and 77th Street) in 1914. Together, they were the parents of five children:

- Eweretta Kernochan (1870–1954), who did not marry.
- William Kernochan (b. 1873), who died in infancy.
- Frederic Kernochan (1876–1937), a Chief Justice of the Court of Special Sessions who married Elizabeth Howland (1885–1973).
- Mary Stuart Whitney Kernochan (b. 1880), who married Courtland Smith (1884-1970), son of Orlando J. Smith, in 1929.
- Whitney Kernochan (1884–1969), who married Helen (née Gaynor) Bradford (1894–1951), daughter of New York City Mayor William Jay Gaynor, in 1921. She was divorced from Edward Thomas Bedford, a son of oilman E.T. Bedford.

== Death ==
His wife died at their country home in Bernardsville, New Jersey, on August 11, 1922. He later resided at 907 Fifth Avenue. Kernochan died in New York City on August 17, 1929, and after a funeral service at Grace Church, he was buried at Green-Wood Cemetery in Brooklyn, which was founded by his wife's grandfather. His estate was split between his four living children.
