= Trumbull Cary =

American politician (1787–1869)

Hon. Trumbull Cary

New York State Bank Commissioner
- In office 1840–1843
- Preceded by: Hiram Denio

Member of the New York State Senate from the 8th District
- In office January 1, 1831 – December 31, 1834
- Preceded by: George H. Boughton
- Succeeded by: Isaac Lacey

Member of the New York State Assembly from the District of Genesee County
- In office January 1, 1828 – December 31, 1828
- Preceded by: Shubeal Dunham
- Succeeded by: John Hascall

Personal details
- Born: August 11, 1787 Mansfield, Connecticut, US
- Died: June 20, 1869 (aged 81) Batavia, New York, US
- Resting place: Batavia Cemetery
- Party: Anti-Mason
- Spouse: Margaret Elinor Brisbane
- Children: Walter Cary
- Relatives: George Cary (grandson); Seward Cary (grandson); Albert Brisbane (nephew); Charles Cary Rumsey (great-grandson)
- Profession: Politician, Banker

Trumbull Cary (August 11, 1787 Mansfield, Connecticut – June 20, 1869 Batavia, New York) was an American banker, lawyer, and politician from New York.

== Early life ==
Trumbull Cary was born in Mansfield, Connecticut, on August 11, 1787. He was the son of Ebenezer Cary (1732–1816) and Sarah Cary (née Trumbull) (1741–1830). In 1805, aged 18, he moved to Batavia, New York, with his parents. In 1808, his father was one of two merchants operating in Batavia at the time.

== Career ==
After moving to Batavia, Cary served as the Postmaster of the town for more than twenty years. In 1822, Cary, along with two other citizens, petitioned New York State to incorporate the village of Batavia. The measure failed, but they tried again the following year, and the State approved the incorporation of the village of Batavia on April 23, 1823.

=== Government service ===
He was a member of the New York State Assembly (Genesee Co.) in 1828. From 1831 to 1834, he was a member of the New York State Senate (8th D.), sitting in the 54th (serving alongside future U.S. President Millard Fillmore), 55th, 56th and 57th New York State Legislatures. At the time, the Eighth District consisted of Allegany, Cattaraugus, Chautauqua, Erie, Genesee, Livingston, Monroe, Niagara and Orleans counties. While serving in the Senate, he met William H. Seward, who later became the Governor of New York, a United States Senator, and the U.S. Secretary of State from 1861 to 1869. Seward and Cary maintained a close personal and political friendship for the rest of Cary's life. In 1840, Cary became the New York State Bank Commissioner, a role in which he served until 1843.

=== Bank of Genesee ===
In the early 19th century, Batavia was the headquarters of the Holland Land Company, owners of the Holland Purchase that became Western New York. As the largest settlement in the region at the time, it was an ideal place for a bank, and thus the Bank of Genesee was established in the city in 1829, with Cary as one of the incorporators and its first president. For the bank's first year, it operated out of his mansion in Batavia. Cary served as president of the bank for over twenty years, and was a director of the bank until his death in 1869.

== Personal life ==
In 1817, he erected the Cary Mansion in Batavia, a 24-room Greek revival structure. It was said that the home was erected as a condition for his eventual bride, Margaret Elinor Brisbane, to marry Cary. Brisbane was the sister of utopian socialist Albert Brisbane and the aunt of Arthur Brisbane, one of the best known newspaper editors of the 20th century. Trumbull married Margaret on June 2, 1817. Together they had one son:

- Dr. Walter Cary (1818–1881), who married Julia Love (niece of Brig.-Gen. George Maltby Love); parents of seven, including architect George Cary (who married Allithea Birge) and polo-player Seward Cary (whose eldest daughter Phoebe married Arthur Brisbane in 1912).

For nearly 50 years, he was a vestryman at St. James Church in Batavia. Cary died on June 20, 1869, in Batavia, New York, and was interred at Batavia Cemetery.

New York State Senate
Preceded by George H. Boughton	New York State Senate; Eighth District (Class 4); 1831–1834	Succeeded by Isaac Lacey
