= Orlando J. Smith =

American philosopher and agnostic

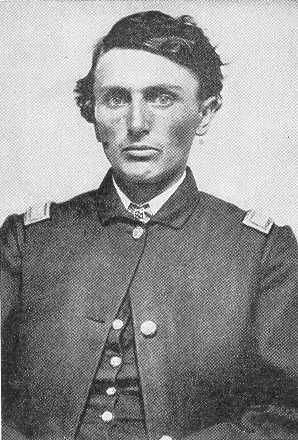
- Born: Orlando Jay Smith; June 14, 1842; Terre Haute, Indiana
- Died: December 20, 1908 (aged 66); Dobbs Ferry, New York
- Occupation: Philosopher
- Spouse: Eva Berry (m. 1881)
- Children: Evelyn Woodford Smith; Courtland Smith; Mabel Follin Smith

Orlando Jay Smith (June 14, 1842 – December 20, 1908) was an early 20th-century American philosopher. Though he was an avowed agnostic, he advocated for the search to a meaning in life which would be commensurate with the possible existence of an ultimate intelligence.

== Early life ==
Smith was born on June 14, 1842, in Terre Haute, Indiana. He fought in the Civil War, and was wounded near Atlanta, Georgia, on August 3, 1864. He achieved the rank of Major.

== Career ==
He was editor of the Terre Haute Mail, the Terre Haute Express, the Chicago Express and was the Founder of the American Press Association in 1882, whose General Office in 1910 was at 225, West 39th Street, New York. He lived at Bonneview, his estate in Dobbs Ferry, New York.

Among works by Smith were A Short View of Great Questions (1899), The Coming Democracy, Balance the Fundamental Variety (1904), The Agreement Between Science and Religion (1906) and Eternalism: A Theory Of Infinite Justice (1902).

== Philosophy ==
Smith didn't call himself religious, he thought that both religion and science had been misinterpreted and perverted. He argued that just as there is a balance in the natural world, so there is a balance in the spiritual world. And that just as no good would go unrewarded, no evil would go unpunished. Though an agnostic, Smith nevertheless believed in reincarnation and his book A Short View of Great Quests inspired Henry Ford the industrialist and founder of the Ford Motor Company to take an interest at least in reincarnation.

Smith distilled his philosophy into three fundamentals:

1. That the soul is accountable for its action;
2. That the soul survives death;
3. That there is a supreme power to right things.

== Personal life ==
On March 28, 1881, Smith was married to Evelyn Virginia "Eva" Berry (1861–1944), a daughter of Walter G. Berry and Virginia R. (née Edmonston) Berry. Together, they were the parents of three children:

- Evelyn Woodford Smith (1882–1956), who married Eric Lawrence Hodge (1894–1962).
- Courtland Smith (1884–1970), who married Elinor Cary, a daughter of polo-player Seward Cary.
- Mabel Follin Smith (1886–1938), who married attorney Jerome Monks (1873–1946) in 1914. In 1920, they bought the Cyrus West Field estate in Dobbs Ferry, New York.

Smith died on December 20, 1908, at Bonneview in Dobbs Ferry, New York. In 1910, after his death, his son commissioned his portrait to be painted by the Swiss-born American artist Adolfo Müller-Ury, who also painted his daughter-in-law's portrait six months later.
