= Meadow Brook Steeplechase Association =

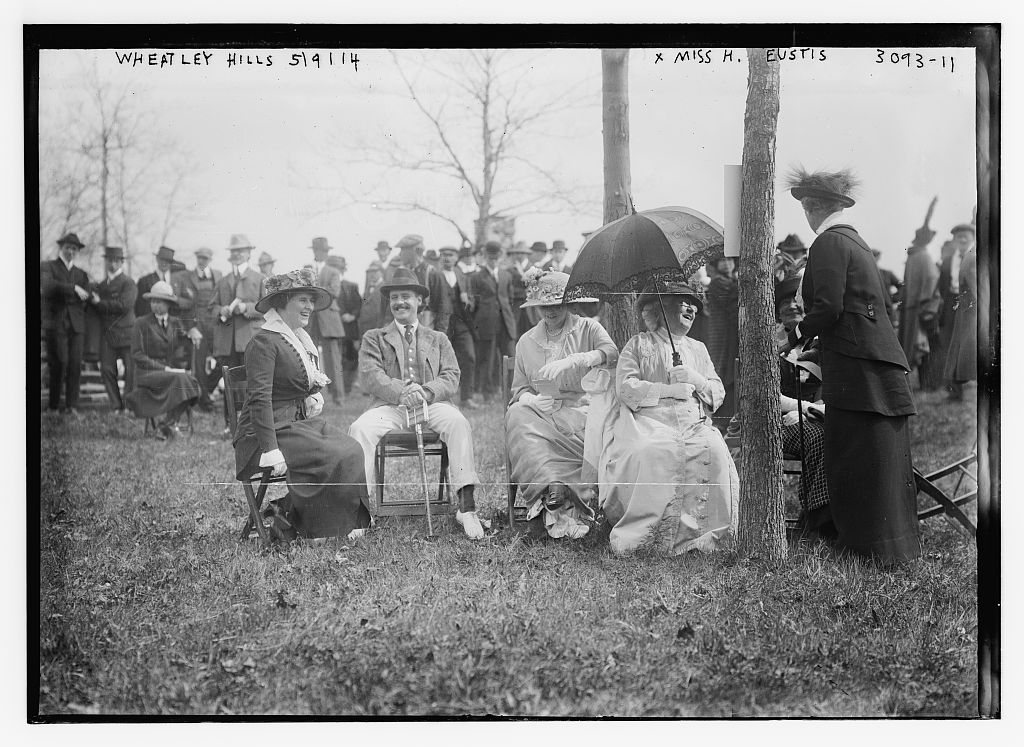
May 9, 1914 for the Meadow Brook Steeplechase Association horse race

Meadow Brook Steeplechase Association was a racing group on Long Island created on May 1, 1897. In 1914 their race was held on the property of Harry Payne Whitney.
