= Courtland Smith =

American politician

Assistant Postmaster General of the United States
- In office March 4, 1921 – 1922

Personal details
- Born: March 7, 1884
- Died: August 9, 1970 (aged 86); Santa Fe, New Mexico, US
- Resting place: Sleepy Hollow Cemetery
- Spouse(s): Elinor Cary (m. 1912; div. 1929) Mary Stuart Whitney Kernochan (after 1929)
- Parent(s): Orlando J. Smith; Evelyn Virginia Berry Smith
- Education: University of Wisconsin–Madison

Courtland Smith (March 7, 1884 – August 9, 1970) was an American film executive who was also assistant postmaster general of the United States and president of the American Press Association, which was founded by his father in 1882.

== Early life ==
Smith was born on March 7, 1884. He was a son of Maj. Orlando Jay Smith (1842–1908) and Evelyn Virginia (née Berry) Smith (1861–1944). Among his siblings was Evelyn Woodford Smith Hodge and Mabel Follin Smith Monks. His father founded the American Press Association, a syndicate for country newspapers, in 1882.

Smith graduated from the University of Wisconsin–Madison in 1907.

== Career ==
In 1921, while president of the American Press Association and after actively and successfully supporting Warren G. Harding in his bid for the presidency, Smith relocated to Washington, D.C. to begin work as assistant postmaster-general for postal savings under the postmaster general, Will H. Hays. In the following year, however, he resigned to become vice president and secretary under Hays (who was peripherally involved in the Teapot Dome scandal) as president of the newly formed Motion Picture Producers and Distributors of America.

An innovator in early sound newsreels, Smith became vice president of Fox Film Corporation, managing the Fox interests in the East and being general manager of the Fox-Case Corporation. He also helped to establish the Fox Movietone News, an early sound newsreel, and Newsreel Theater, which showed documentary sound shorts, and produced short sound subjects with Robert Benchley, Beatrice Lillie and Gertrude Lawrence. In the 1930s, he helped to establish the Trans‐Lux Theaters before becoming president of Pathé News, Inc., which he grew throughout the world.

== Personal life ==
Smith was married twice. In 1921, he married his first wife, Elinor Cary (1888–1965), a daughter of the polo player Seward Cary, and sister‐in‐law of Arthur Brisbane, editor of the Hearst publications. Before he divorced Elinor in Sonora, Mexico, on January 16, 1929, they were the parents of:

- Evelyn "Evie" Smith (b. 1913), who married John Barnes Mull.
- Orlando Jay Smith (1914–1930)
- Archibald Boyesen Smith (1917–1935), who was killed in a car accident.

On February 8, 1929, less than a month after his divorce, Smith married Mary Stuart Whitney Kernochan (b. 1880), a daughter of J. Frederic Kernochan and a sister of the late chief justice of the New York Court of Special Sessions, Frederic Kernochan. Together, they lived at 255 East 71st Street. In his later life, he lived at Pembroke Park in Dublin for two years before returning to the United States. Smith died at his daughter's ranch in Santa Fe, New Mexico, on August 9, 1970. He was buried at Sleepy Hollow Cemetery in Tarrytown, New York.
