= Buffalo History Museum =

Museum in Buffalo, New York

- The Buffalo History Museum
- U.S. National Register of Historic Places
- U.S. National Historic Landmark
- New York State Register of Historic Places
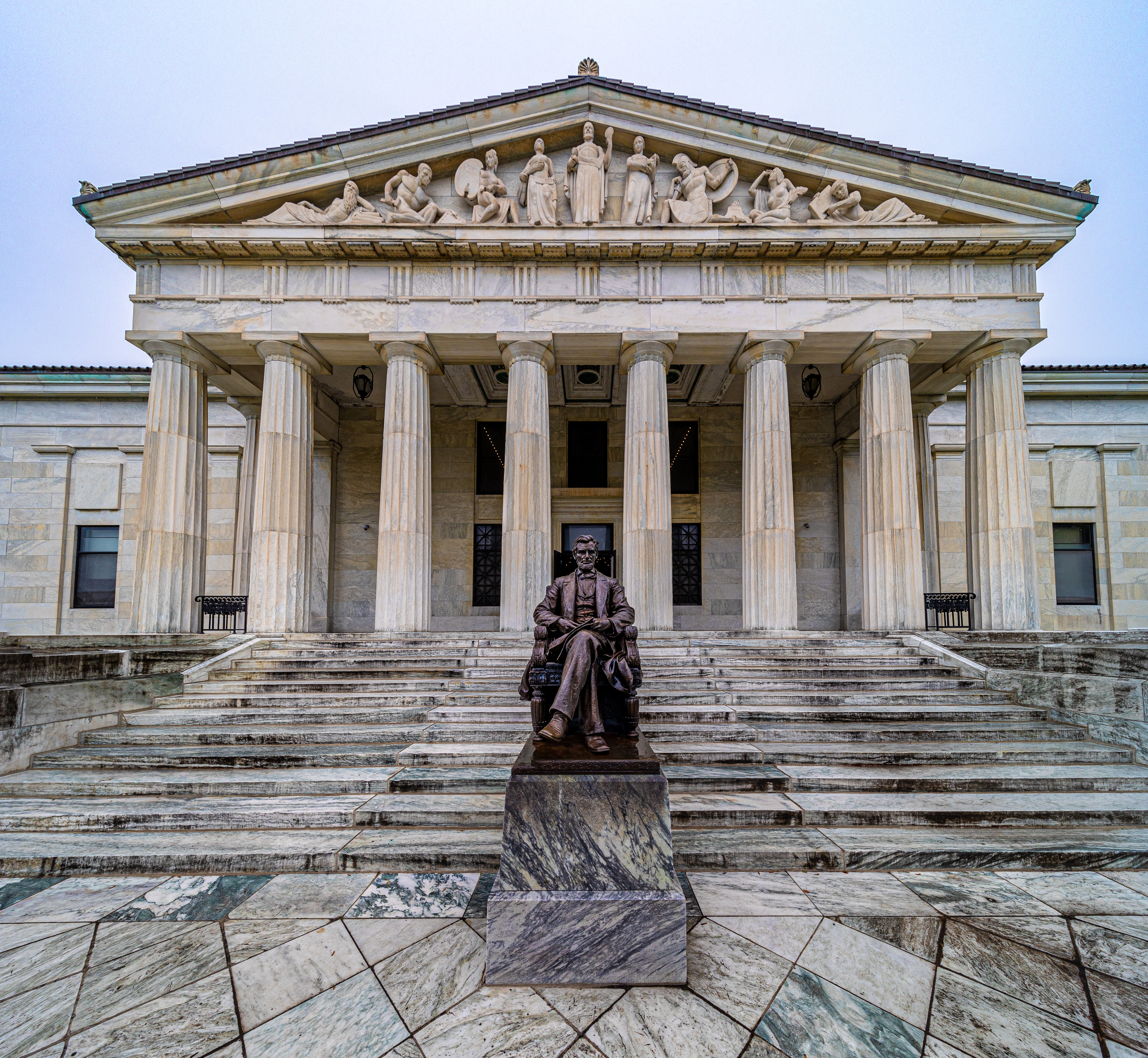
- South facade, 2023

- Location within New York Location within the United States
- Location: One Museum Court, Buffalo, NY
- Coordinates: 42°56′08″N 78°52′36″W
- Area: less than one acre
- Built: 1901
- Architect: Cary, George
- Architectural style: Neoclassical
- NRHP reference No.: 80002606
- NYSRHP No.: 02940.000020

Significant dates
- Added to NRHP: April 23, 1980
- Designated NHL: February 27, 1987
- Designated NYSRHP: June 23, 1980

The Buffalo History Museum (founded as the Buffalo Historical Society, and later named the Buffalo and Erie County Historical Society) is located at 1 Museum Court (formerly 25 Nottingham Court) in Buffalo, New York. It is located just east of Elmwood Avenue and off of Nottingham Terrace, north of the Scajaquada Expressway, in the northwest corner of Delaware Park. The building that houses the Buffalo History Museum was constructed in 1901 for the Pan-American Exposition and designed by Buffalo architect George Cary. The building is listed on the National Register of Historic Places and designated a National Historic Landmark.

== History ==
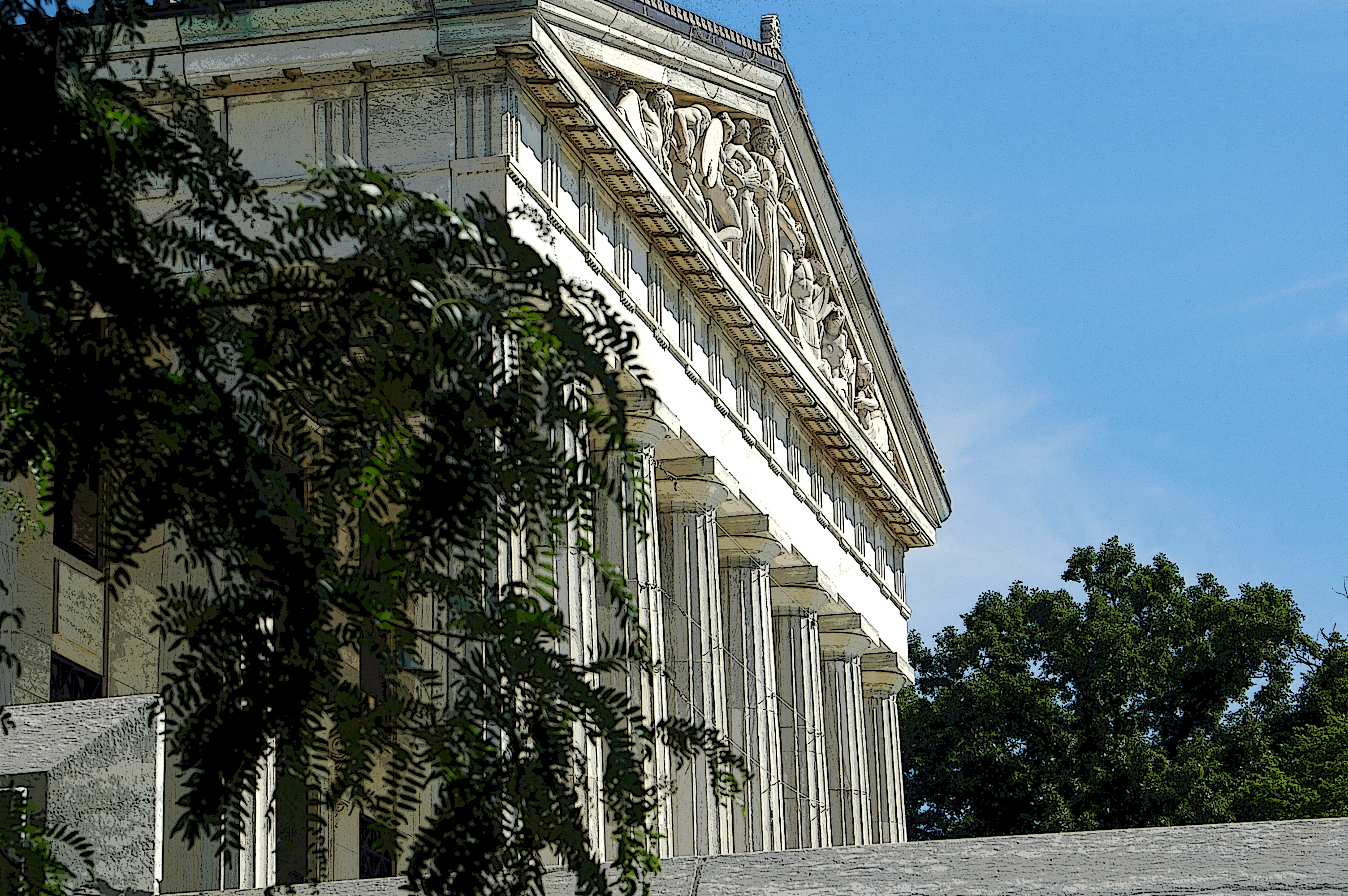
The Buffalo History Museum, pediment detail

The building that houses the Buffalo History Museum was constructed in 1901 as the New York State pavilion for that year's Pan-American Exposition, and is the sole surviving permanent structure from the exposition. As planned, the Buffalo Historical Society moved into the building after the exposition.

Designed by Buffalo architect George Cary (1859–1945), its south portico is meant to evoke the Parthenon in Athens. The building was listed on the National Register of Historic Places in 1980 and designated a National Historic Landmark in 1987.

Founded in 1862, the Buffalo Historical Society's first president was Millard Fillmore. Its exhibits, programs, and events are attended by schoolchildren, families, and students. It has hosted observances of Lincoln's Birthday for over a century and features a bronze statue by sculptor Charles H. Niehaus in 1902 on the museums portico.

From 1879 to 1947, the Society published pioneering scholarship on the people, events, and history of the Niagara Frontier. Many of those volumes are now online in full text.

In 1960, the Buffalo Historical Society changed its name to the Buffalo and Erie County Historical Society, and on October 25, 2012, the Buffalo and Erie County Historical Society announced it was rebranding itself as The Buffalo History Museum.

== Exhibits ==
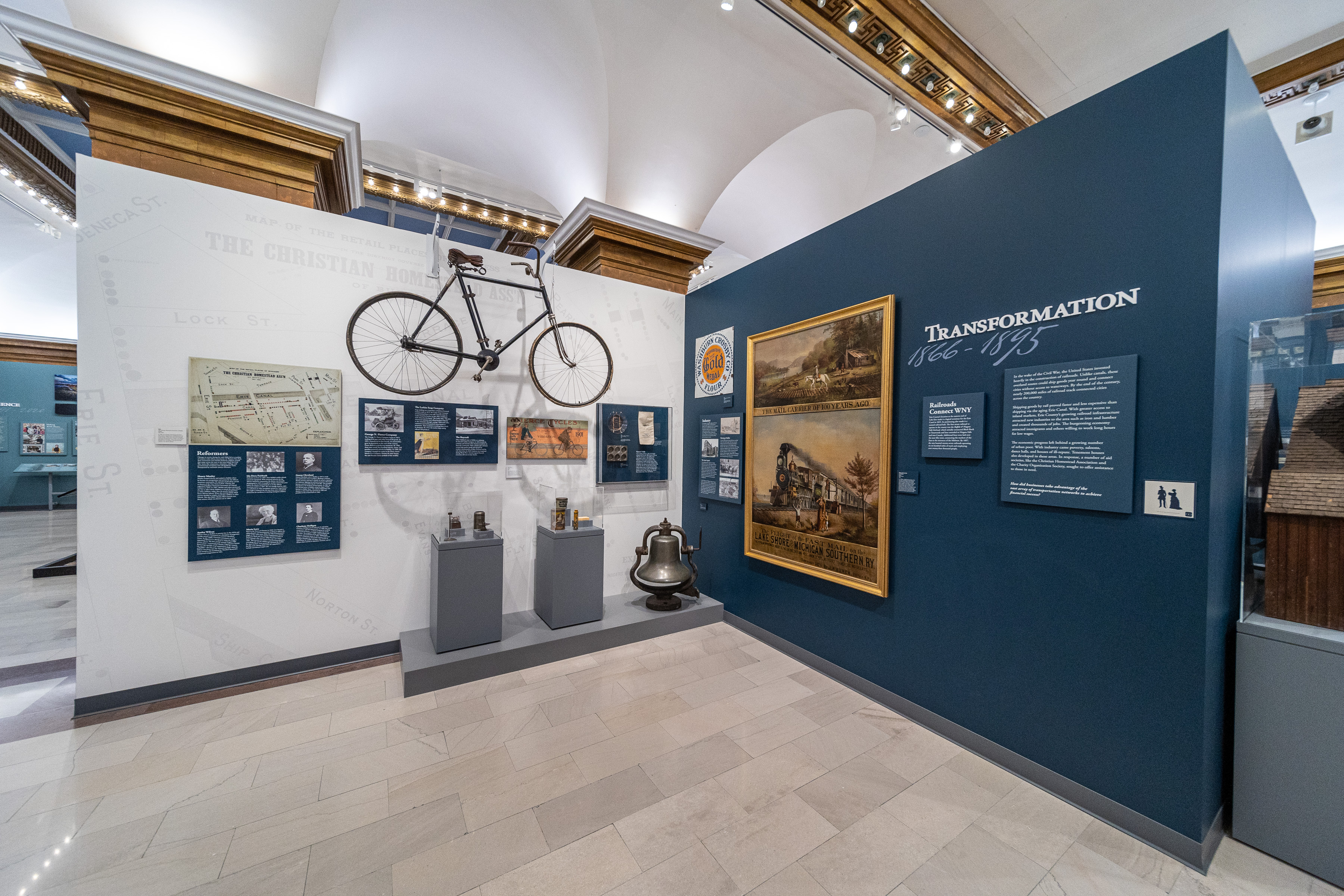
Bicycle exhibit

All three floors of the building offer exhibits, including the Rotary Gallery (featuring elaborate model trains), the Pioneer Gallery, the Erie County Room, the State Court, the Community Gallery, Native American Gallery, Neighbors, and ICONS. A recreation of Tim Russert's office opened in October 2014 after having been installed at the Newseum in Washington, D.C. On view by appointment in the museum's Resource Center on Forest Avenue is the gun used by Leon F. Czolgosz to shoot President William McKinley at the Exposition's Temple of Music on September 6, 1901.

In November 2017, the Buffalo History Museum opened the Icons: The Makers and Moments of Buffalo Sports exhibit. The new exhibit explores Buffalo New York's rich sports history and investigates the unique connection between fans and the beloved teams and sports idols of the area. Highlights include Ralph Wilson's hall of fame jacket, the only helmet Scott Norwood ever wore during his career as a Buffalo Bill, and a changing exhibit currently featuring the Buffalo Beauts.

== Research library ==
Of particular interest to historians, genealogists, researchers, and house history buffs are the collections of the Research Library. Notable collections include:

- The Millard Fillmore Papers
- The Peter Buell Porter Papers
- The Mary Burnett Talbert papers
- The Larkin Company records and memorabilia
- The Pan-American Exposition collection
- Maris B. Pierce's papers

Additional resources include:

- 100,000 artifacts
- 20,000 books
- 200,000 photographs
- 50,000 plans
- Drawings
- Maps
- Posters
- Prints
- Broadsides
- 6,500 microfilms of newspapers
- Church records
- Cemetery records
- Censuses
- Pamphlets
- Clippings

In addition there is similar ephemera that documents the people, places, architecture, organizations, businesses, and events in the Buffalo and Niagara frontier region. A number of detailed bibliographies on popular topics are online at WorldCat.

FRANK, the library's growing catalog of 25,000 books and manuscripts, is freely searchable online.

=== Same-sex wedding memorabilia ===
In 2011, after the passage of equal marriage in the State of New York, the Research Library became the first known library in the United States to collect wedding memorabilia from legally wed same-sex couples.

== Amateis pediment ==
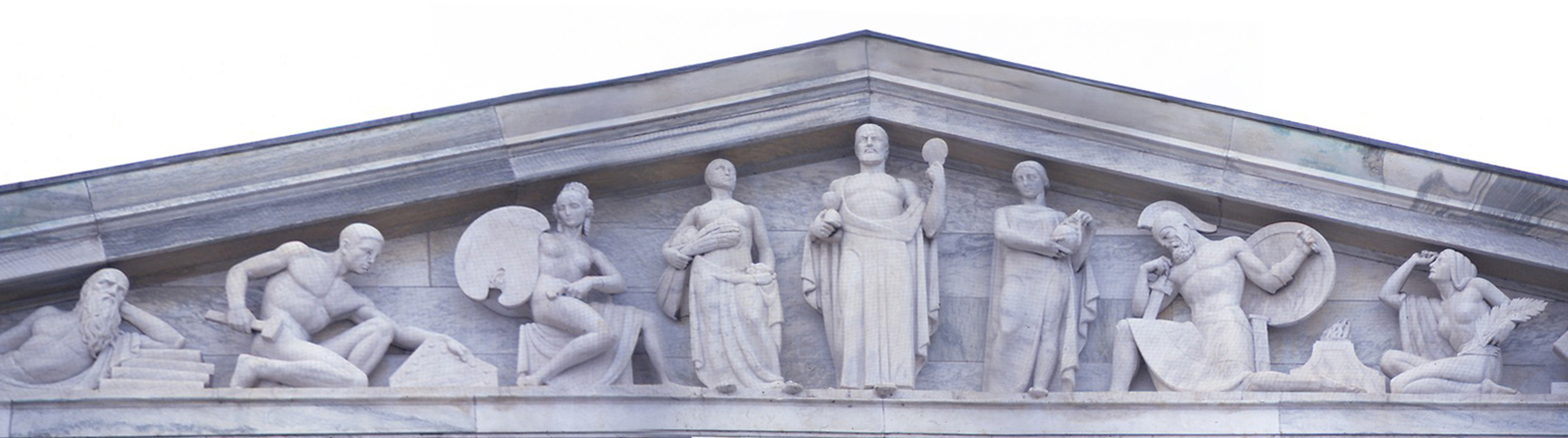
Buffalo History Museum pediment

The pediment atop the museum was designed by Edmond Amateis and includes clothed, semi-nude and nude classical figures.
