= James Powell Kernochan =

American businessman and clubman

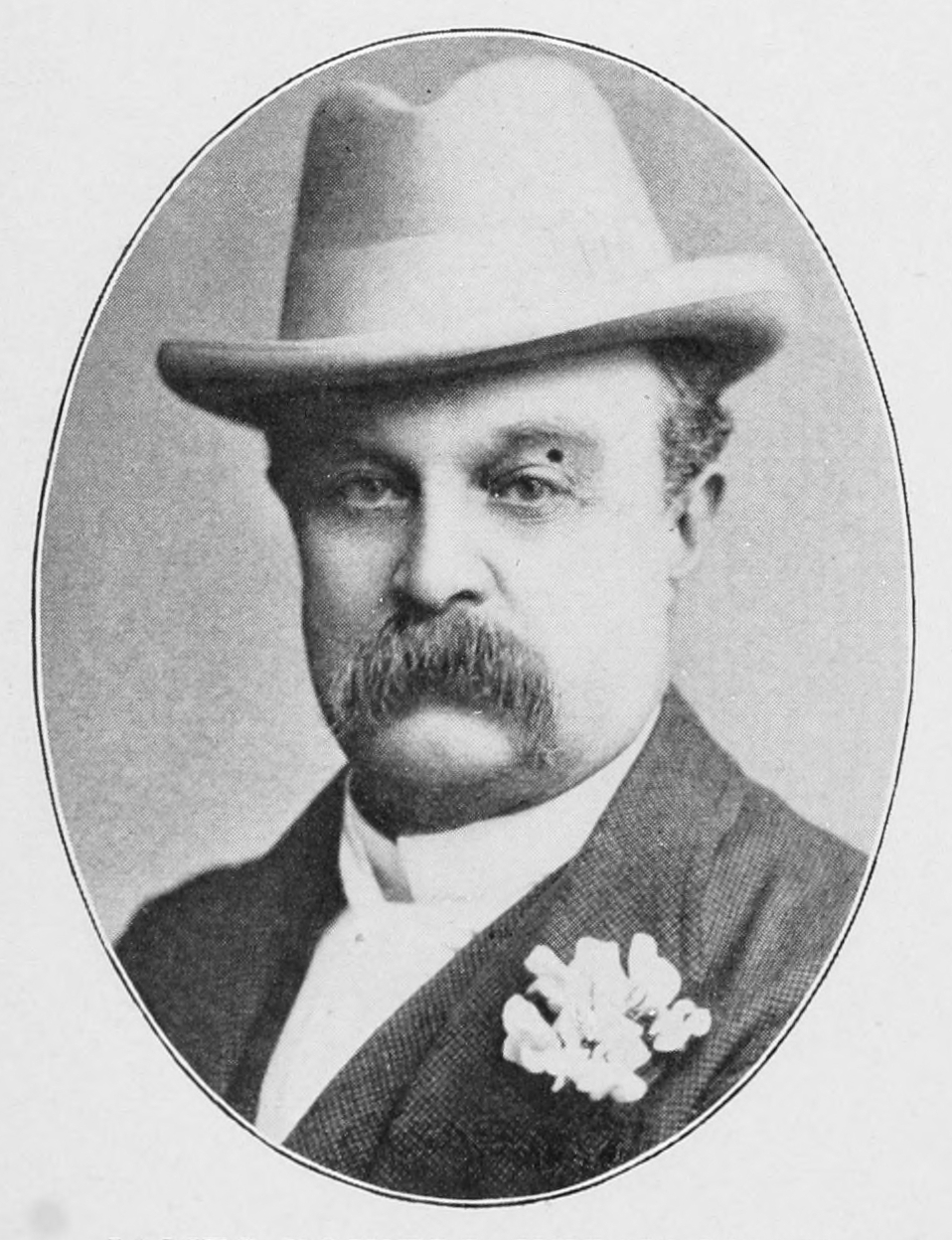
- Born: October 22, 1831; New York City, New York, U.S.
- Died: March 6, 1897 (aged 65); New York City, New York, U.S.
- Spouse: Catherine Lorillard
- Children: Katherine Lorillard Kernochan; James Lorillard Kernochan
- Parent(s): Joseph Kernochan; Margaret Eliza Seymour
- Relatives: J. Frederic Kernochan (brother); Herbert Pell, Jr. (grandson)

James Powell Kernochan (October 22, 1831 – March 6, 1897) was an American businessman and clubman who was prominent in New York society during the Gilded Age.

== Early life ==
Kernochan was born on October 22, 1831, in New York City in a house at 8th Street and Second Avenue. He was the son of Joseph Kernochan (1789–1864) and Margaret Eliza (née Seymour) Kernochan (1804–1845). His siblings included William Seymour Kernochan, and Elizabeth Powell Kernochan Garr, John Adams Kernochan, Henry Parish Kernochan, Ann Adams Kernochan, Frank Edward Kernochan, and J. Frederic Kernochan. His father, who was born in Scotland and came to America in 1790 as a baby, was a dry goods merchant and banker and a founder of the University Club of New York.

His paternal grandparents were William and Esther Kernochan, Scotch-Irish Presbyterians who had a farm in Orange County, and his maternal grandparents were William Seymour and Eliza (née Powell) Seymour, an English family who lived in Brooklyn.

== Career ==
Along with Albon Man, a New York attorney, William E. Sawyer, an electrical engineer, Hugh McCulloch, and others, Kernochan was an initial investor-partner in Electro-Dynamic Light Company, a lighting and electrical distribution company organized in 1878. Electro-Dynamic Light was the first company organized specifically to manufacture and sell incandescent electric light bulbs.

Mainly, his business career consisted of managing his wife's and his own estate. At the time of his death, was a trustee of the Lorillard, Spencer, and Marshall estates, as well as a director of the New York Life Insurance and Trust Company.

=== Society life ===
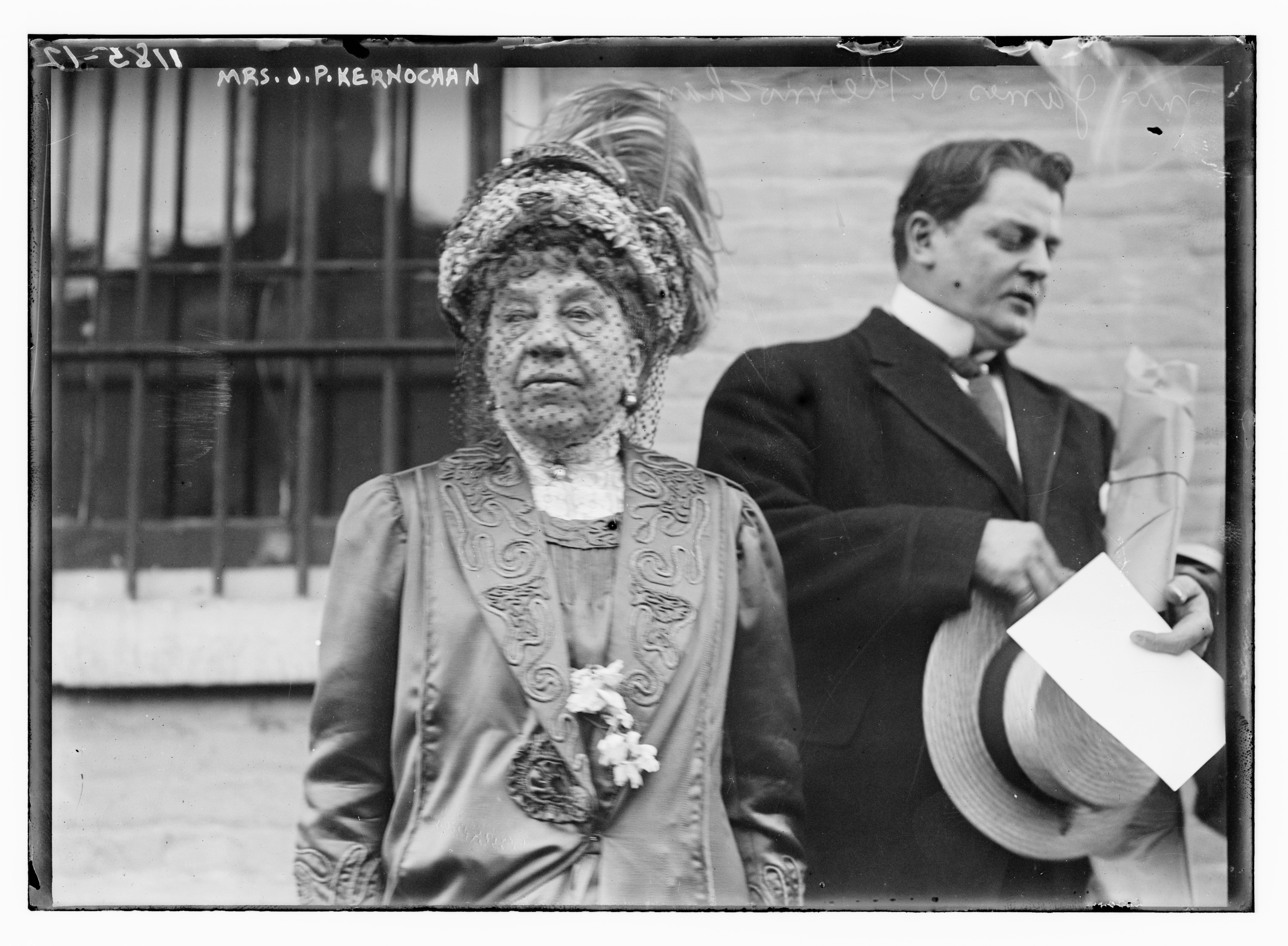
Catherine Lorillard Kernochen

In 1892, Kernochan and his wife Catherine were included in Ward McAllister's "Four Hundred", purported to be an index of New York's best families, published in The New York Times. Conveniently, 400 was the number of people that could fit into Mrs. Astor's ballroom.

He was a governor of the Metropolitan Club, the Union Club of the City of New York, the Tuxedo Club, and the Rockaway Hunting Club. Following Ward McAllister's death, served as one of the leads of the Patriarchs Ball alongside William Watts Sherman, George G. Haven, Charles Lanier, and William C. Whitney.

== Personal life ==
Kernochan was married to Catherine Lorillard (1835–1917), the daughter of Pierre Lorillard III, an inheritor of the Lorillard Tobacco Company fortune. Her siblings included Pierre Lorillard IV, Mary Lorillard Barbey, and George Lyndes Lorillard. They owned a residence in New York City at 824 Fifth Avenue and a home in Newport, Rhode Island. Together, James and Catherine were the parents of:

- Katherine Lorillard "Kitty" Kernochan (1858–1949), who married Herbert Claiborne Pell (1853–1926), one of the founders of Tuxedo Park, New York.
- James Lorillard Kernochan (1867–1903), who married Eloise Stevenson (1872–1948), the daughter of Vernon King Stevenson, the first president of the Nashville & Chattanooga Railroad, in 1891. After his death, she remarried to Alexander Butler Duncan.

Kernochan died on March 6, 1897, at his residence, 824 Fifth Avenue, in New York City from a concussion of the brain and cerebral meningitis which resulted from a fall after he had been struck by the shaft of a wagon at Fifth Avenue and 41st Street. He was buried at Green-Wood Cemetery in Brooklyn. His widow died in 1917.

=== Descendants ===
Through his daughter Katherine, he was the grandfather of Herbert Claiborne Pell Jr. (1884–1961), a U.S. Representative from New York, U.S. Minister to Portugal, U.S. Minister to Hungary, and an instigator and member of the United Nations War Crimes Commission. Herbert was the father of Claiborne de Borda Pell (1918–2009), a U.S. Senator from Rhode Island who served for 36 years from 1961 until 1997.
