= Edward C. Corrigan =

Canadian racehorse owner

Edward Corrigan
- Born: May 24, 1843; Saint-Jean-Crysostome, Canada East
- Died: July 4, 1924 (aged 81); Kansas City, Missouri, U.S.
- Resting place: Mount Saint Mary Catholic Cemetery, Kansas City, Missouri
- Occupations: Racetrack owner, racehorse owner, breeder, trainer
- Known for: "Master of Hawthorne"; 1884 American Derby; 1890 Kentucky Derby

Edward C. Corrigan (May 24, 1843 - July 4, 1924) was a Canadian-born racetrack proprietor, racehorse owner/breeder and trainer in American Thoroughbred racing whose New York Times obituary called him a "once powerful turf figure". It, The San Francisco Examiner, the Chicago Examiner and other U.S. newspapers regularly referred to him as the "Master of Hawthorne" for founding Hawthorne Race Course in Cicero, Illinois, in 1891.

Corrigan was the 1890 Kentucky Derby winner's owner and trainer and in a 1911 article on Derby history the Daily Racing Form called him "the man who at one time controlled more racing property and owned a greater stable of horses than any other turfman of his time."
