= Flora Payne =

American socialite and philanthropist

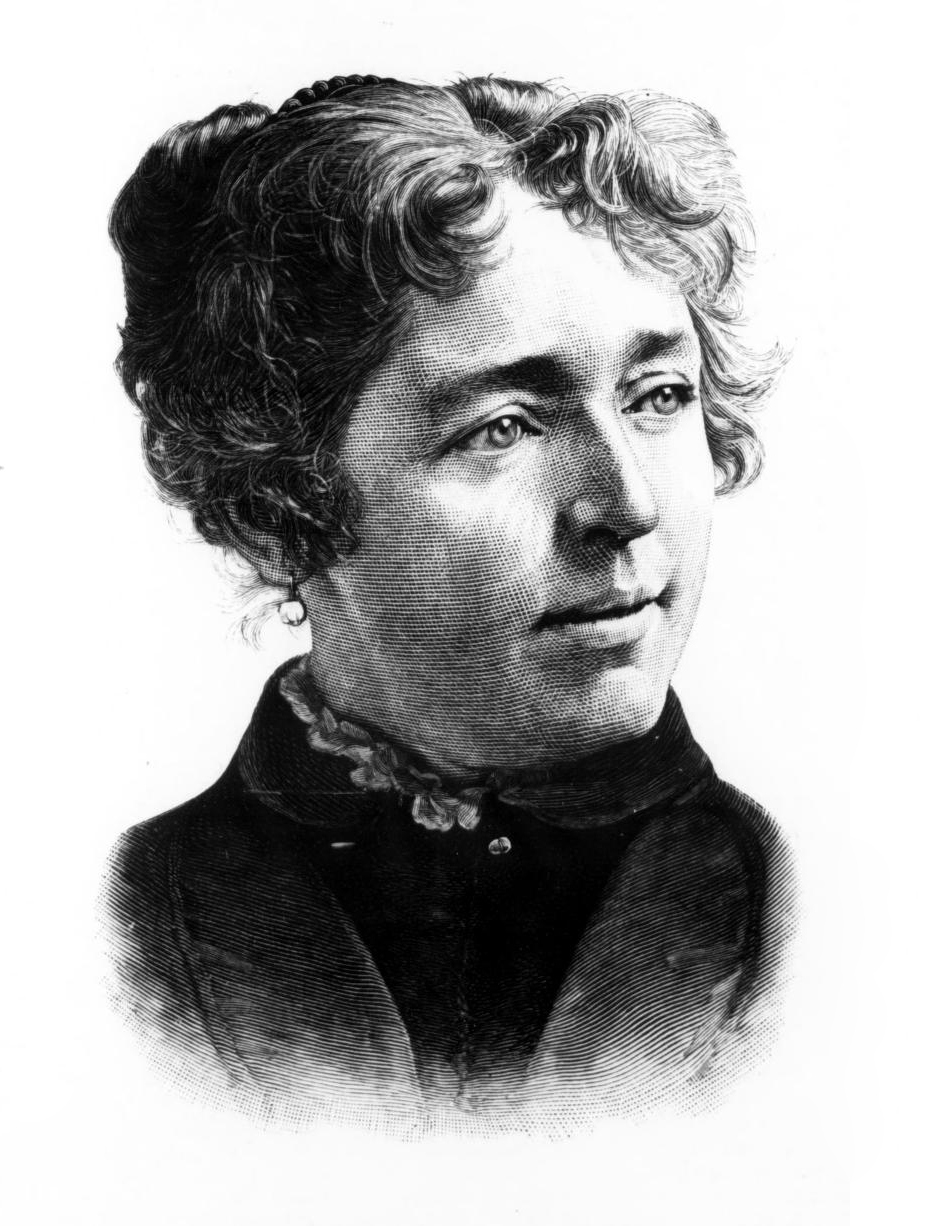
- Born: January 25, 1842; Cleveland, Ohio, U.S.
- Died: February 5, 1893 (aged 51); New York City, U.S.
- Spouse: William Collins Whitney (m. 1869)
- Children: 5, including Harry, Pauline, William, Dorothy
- Parent(s): Mary Perry Payne; Henry B. Payne
- Relatives: See Whitney family

Flora Payne Whitney (January 25, 1842 – February 5, 1893) was an American socialite and philanthropist, originally from Cleveland, Ohio who moved to New York City and married into the Whitney family. She was the daughter of Henry B. Payne, a U.S. Senator, and the wife of William Collins Whitney, the U.S. Secretary of the Navy.

== Early life ==
Flora Payne was born in Cleveland, Ohio, on January 25, 1842. She was the eldest daughter of Mary (née Perry) Payne (1818–1895) and U.S. Senator Henry B. Payne of Ohio Among her siblings were lifelong bachelors Nathan P. Payne, who became the mayor of Cleveland, and Oliver Hazard Payne, who served as treasurer of the Standard Oil Company.

She received an excellent education "in which artistic accomplishments were not lacking. Her love of music was instinctive and she developed talent in that direction of a high order."

== Society life ==
In 1892, Flora and her husband were included in Ward McAllister's "Four Hundred", purported to be an index of New York's best families led by Mrs. Astor, as published in The New York Times. Conveniently, 400 was the number of people that could fit into Mrs. Astor's ballroom. Reportedly, few women "in her station in life have enjoyed to so complete an extent the cordial, friendly esteem of all classes of people. By her gentle, womanly graces she endeared herself to every one who enjoyed the privilege of her acquaintance. She bore the responsibilities of social leadership with appropriate dignity, and yet with a tactfulness that was exquisite."

While her husband was serving as the Secretary of the Navy, she became close friends with President Cleveland's wife, the former Frances Folsom. When Flora's "little girl was born" in 1887, "it was the gracious lady of the White House who suggested the name of Dorothy, which was bestowed upon the babe." After they left Washington, the Whitneys split their time between New York City, Lenox, Massachusetts, and Newport, Rhode Island (where they bought the former residence of William R. Travers).

== Personal life ==
On October 13, 1869, Flora Payne married William Collins Whitney, a friend and Yale classmate of her brother Oliver. Whitney's parents were Brigadier General James Scollay Whitney and Laurinda (née Collins) Whitney, a descendant of Plymouth governor William Bradford.

William's older brother was industrialist Henry Melville Whitney, president of the Metropolitan Steamship Company, and later founder of the Dominion Coal Company and Dominion Iron and Steel Company. His sister, Laurinda Collins "Lily" Whitney married Charles T. Barney, who became the president of the Knickerbocker Trust Company. Another sister, Susan Collins Whitney, married prominent attorney Henry F. Dimock. Together, the Whitneys had five children who lived beyond infancy:

- Harry Payne Whitney (1872–1930), who married Gertrude Vanderbilt (1875–1942) in 1896.
- Pauline Payne Whitney (1874–1916), who married Almeric Hugh Paget (1861–1949), later 1st Baron Queenborough, in 1895.
- William Payne Whitney (1876–1927), who married Helen Julia Hay (1875–1944) in 1902.
- Oliver Whitney (1878–1883), who died aged 5.
- Dorothy Payne Whitney (1887–1968), who first married Willard Dickerman Straight (1880–1918) and later married Leonard Knight Elmhirst (1893–1974) after Straight's death.

After a three-week illness, Flora died on February 5, 1893, at age 51, at her home in New York City (which had been purchased for her by her brother Oliver). Upon her death, The New York Times wrote that "the grief of her death occasions is felt far beyond the circle of her personal friendships and acquaintance, and beyond the communities in which her social prominence in girlhood and married life had been attained." After a funeral at St. Bartholomew's Church at Madison Avenue and 44th Street, she was buried at Woodlawn Cemetery in The Bronx, New York. The pallbearers at her funeral were former (and future president) Grover Cleveland, Cornelius Vanderbilt, former Gov. George Peabody Wetmore, E. Randolph Robinson, Hamilton McKown Twombly, George H. Bend, George G. Haven, Thomas F. Cushing, Buchanan Winthrop, and Edward A. Wickes. Flora's estate, valued at approximately $3,000,000, was left entirely to her husband through a will executed five days before her death.

Two years later, William Whitney married Edith Sibyl Randolph (née May), the widow of Capt. Arthur Randolph. He acquired for her a residence at Fifth Avenue and 68th Street in New York City, and commissioned McKim, Mead & White to do a $3.5 million renovation of the house. Whitney, who at the time of his death was one of the largest landowners in the eastern United States, died on February 2, 1904, and was also interred at Woodlawn.
