= Whitney family =

Notable American family

- Country: United States
- Origin: England
- Founder: John Whitney
- Connected families: Paget family Vanderbilt family
- Estates: The Elms; Greenwood Plantation

The Whitney family is a prominent American family descended from English emigrant John Whitney (1592–1673), who left London in 1635 and settled in Watertown, Massachusetts. The historic family mansion in Watertown, known as The Elms, was built for the Whitneys in 1710.

Successive generations of the Whitney family have influenced American history. Eli Whitney's invention of the cotton gin in 1793 enabled cotton seeds to be removed 50 times faster, a breakthrough that helped the country produce 75% of the world's cotton supply and boosted the demand for slaves. In 1844, Asa Whitney launched a campaign to build a railway linking the country's west to the east that ultimately resulted in the first transcontinental railroad. William Collins Whitney, who became U.S. Secretary of the Navy in 1885, oversaw the American fleet's adoption of steel ships, which helped the United States become a world power. In the 20th century, family members affected the country's economy through their ownership of conglomerates such as Pan Am, J.H. Whitney & Company, and Freeport-McMoran.

Members of the Whitney family have been major figures for more than a century in the breeding and racing of Thoroughbred horses. The Whitneys pursue philanthropy with the wealth accumulated by past generations. They are members of the Episcopal Church.

== Prominent descendants of John Whitney ==
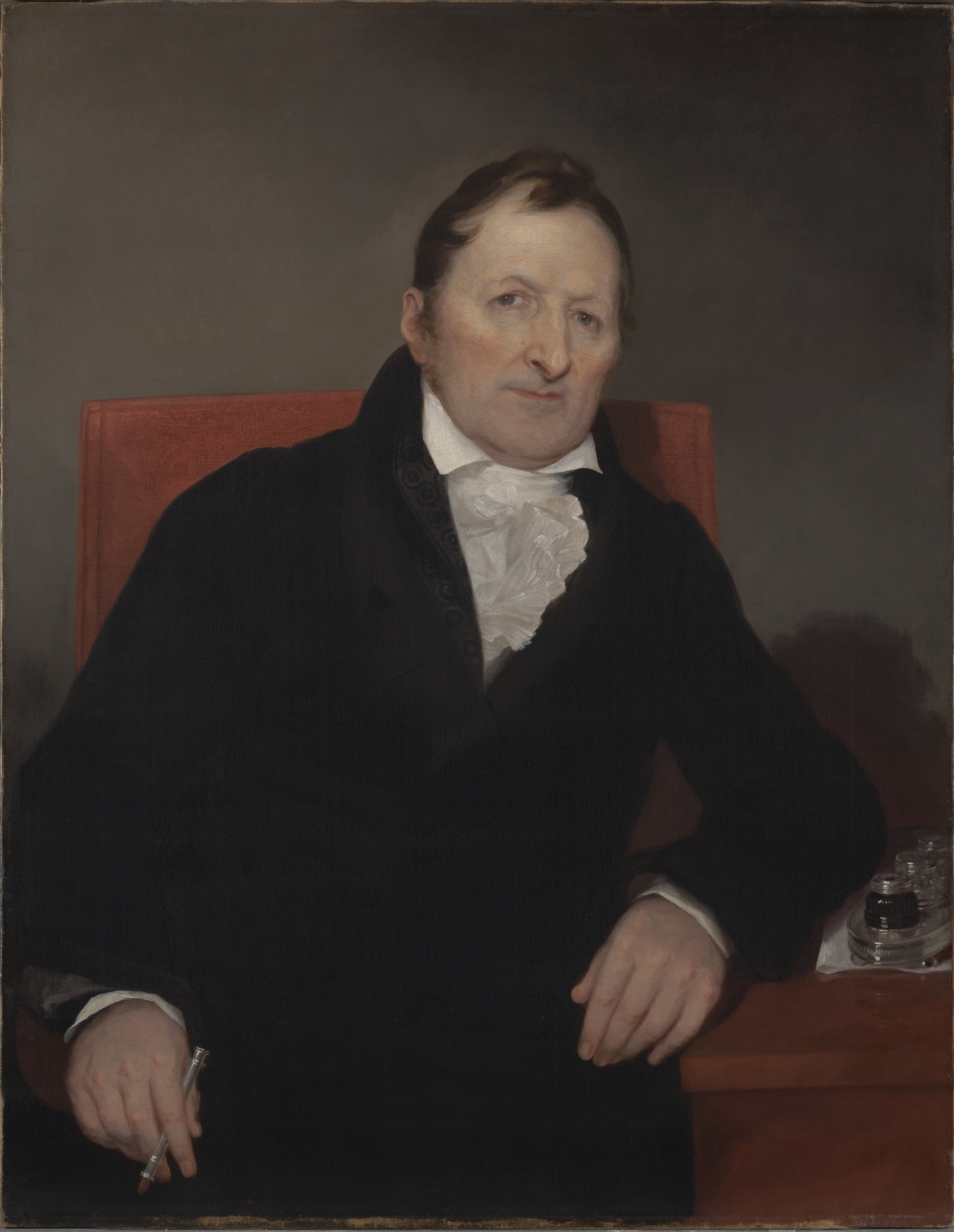
Eli Whitney Jr. (1765–1825), inventor of the cotton gin

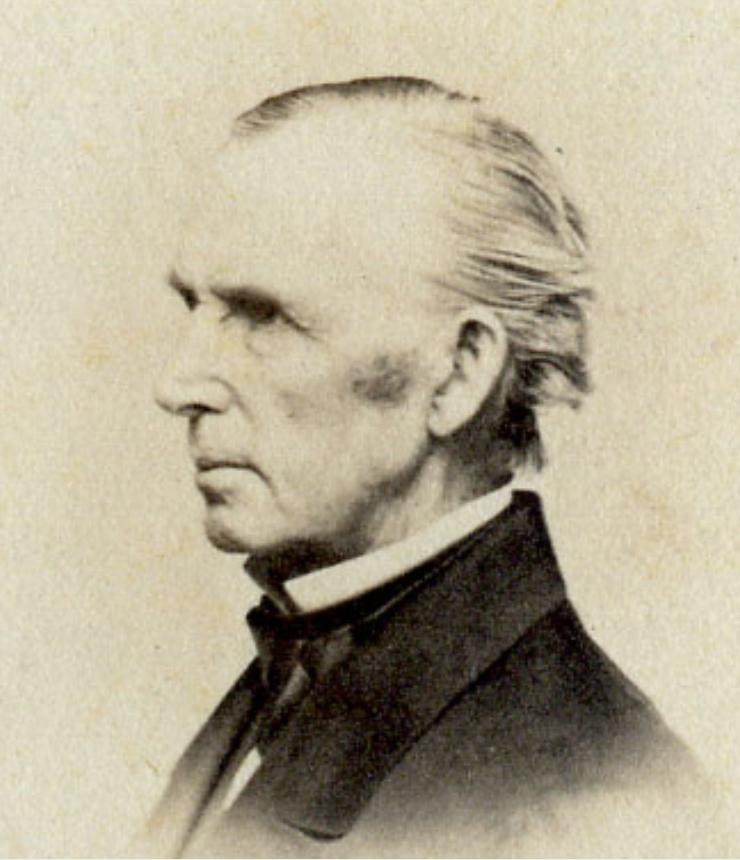
Asa Whitney (1797–1872), a wealthy merchant as well as one of the first proponents of a U.S. transcontinental railroad.

- Amos Whitney (1832–1920)
- Anne Whitney (1821–1915)
- Asa Whitney (1791–1874), canal commissioner
- Asa Whitney (1797–1872)
- Benson Whitney (born 1956)
- Charlotte Anita Whitney (1867–1955)
- Charles Andrew Whitney (1834–1912)
- Cornelius Vanderbilt Whitney (1899–1992), Thoroughbred racehorse owner and co-founder of Pan American Airways Corporation
- Courtney Whitney (1897–1969)
- David Whitney Jr. (1830–1900)
- Dorothy Payne Whitney (1887–1968)
- Edward Baldwin Whitney (1857–1911)
- Eli Whitney Jr. (1765–1825)
  - Eli Whitney Blake (1795–1886), inventor
  - Eli Whitney Blake, Jr. (1836–1895), scientist
  - Eli Whitney Debevoise II (born 1953)
- Flora Payne Whitney (1897–1986)
  - Whitney Tower (1923–1999)
  - Flora Miller Biddle (born 1928)
- Harry Payne Whitney (1872–1930)
- Hassler Whitney (1907–1989)
- Henry Melville Whitney (1839–1923)
- James Lyman Whitney (1835-1910)
- James Scollay Whitney (1811–1878)
- Joan Whitney Payson (1903–1975)
- John Hay Whitney (1905–1982)
- Josephine Whitney Duveneck (1891–1978)
- Josiah Dwight Whitney (1819–1896)
- Mary Watson Whitney (1847–1921)
- Newel Kimball Whitney (1795–1850)
- Orson F. Whitney (1855–1931)
- Parkhurst Whitney (1784–1862)
- Pauline Payne Whitney (1874–1916)
  - Olive, Lady Baillie Olive Cecilia Paget, (1899–1974), Anglo-American heiress, landowner and hostess.
  - Dorothy Wyndham Paget (1905–1960), British racehorse owner and sponsor of motor racing
- William Payne Whitney (1876–1927)
- Phyllis Ayame Whitney (1903–2008)
- Richard Whitney (1888–1974)
- Wheelock Whitney I (1894–1957)
- Wheelock Whitney, Jr. (1926–2016)
- Wheelock Whitney III (born 1949)
- William Collins Whitney (1841–1904), U.S. financier and U.S. Secretary of the Navy
- William Dwight Whitney (1827–1894)
- Willis Rodney Whitney (1868–1958)

By marriage:

- Mary Elizabeth Altemus (1906–1988)
- Charles T. Barney (1851–1907)
- Kathleen Blatz (born 1954)
- Norman Butler (1918-2011)
- Betsey Cushing (1908–1998)
- Henry F. Dimock (1842–1911)
- Leonard Knight Elmhirst (1893–1974)
- Helen Julia Hay (1876–1944)
- Almeric Hugh Paget, 1st Baron Queenborough (1861–1949), British industrialist and politician
- Marie Louise Schroeder (1925–2019)
- Willard Dickerman Straight (1880–1918)
  - Whitney Willard Straight (1912–1979)
  - Beatrice Whitney Straight (1914–2001)
  - Michael Whitney Straight (1916–2004)
- Adeline Dutton Train (1824–1906)
- Gertrude Vanderbilt (1875–1942)
- George W. Headley (1908–1985)
- Dorothy Laverne Whitney (born 1930)
- Alfa Vanderbilt-Winther (1924–2008)

== Collins-Whitney family line ==
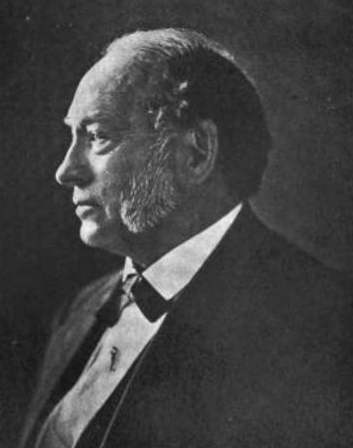
James Scollay Whitney

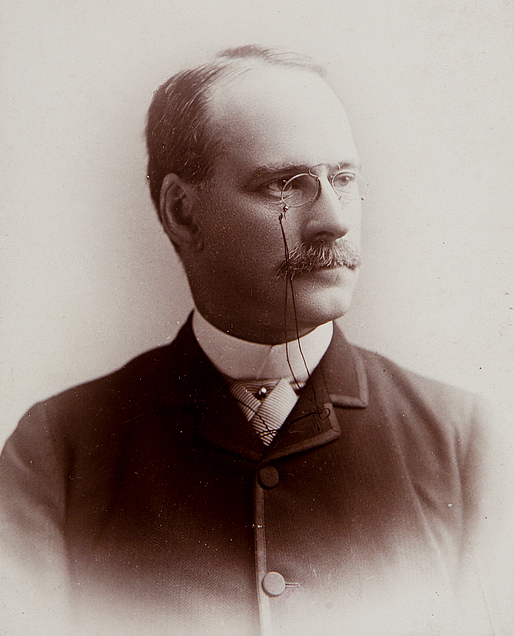
William Collins Whitney

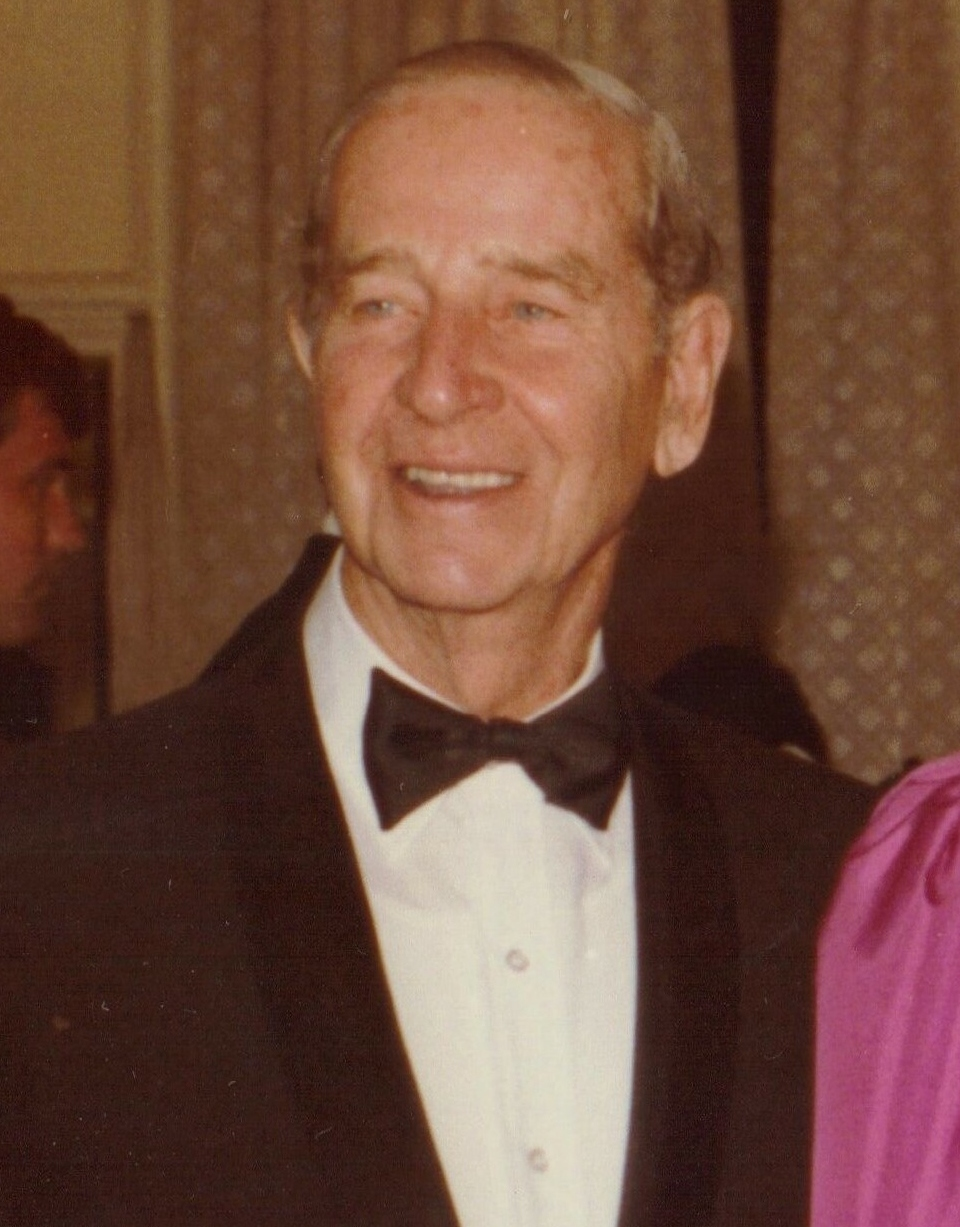
Cornelius Vanderbilt Whitney

- James Scollay Whitney (1811–1878) m. 1886 Laurinda Collins (1810–1908)
  - Henry Melville Whitney (1839–1923) m. 1878 Margaret Foster Green (1856–1932)
  - William Collins Whitney (1841–1904) m. 1869 Flora Payne (1842–1893), m. 1896 Sibyl Randolph
    - Harry Payne Whitney (1872–1930) m. 1896 Gertrude Vanderbilt (1875–1942)
      - Flora Payne Whitney (1897–1986) m. 1920 Roderick Tower (div. 1925), m. 1927 George Macculloch Miller III
        - Pamela Tower (1921–2013) m. Jay Ketchum Secor (1912–1960) 1941 (div. 1950), m. Thomas LeBoutillier (1913–1979)
          - John LeBoutillier (born 1953)
        - Whitney Tower (1923–1999)
        - Flora Miller Biddle (born 1928)
      - Cornelius Vanderbilt Whitney (1899–1992) m. 1923 Marie Norton (1903–1970) (div. 1929), m. 1931 Gwladys Crosby “Gee” Hopkins (div. 1940), m. 1941 Eleanor Searle (c. 1908–2002) (div. 1957), m. 1958 Marie Louise Schroeder (1925–2019)
    - Pauline Payne Whitney (1874–1916) m. 1895 Almeric Hugh Paget, 1st Baron Queenborough (1861–1949)
      - Olive, Lady Baillie (1899–1974) m. 1919 Charles John Frederick Winn (1896–1968) (div. 1925), m. 1925 Arthur Wilson-Filmer (1895–1968) (div. 1930), m. 1931 Adrian Baillie, 6th Baronet (1898–1947) (div. 1944)
        - Pauline Winn (1920–1984) m. 1940 Hon. Edward Frederick Ward (1907–1987) (div. 1947), m. 1948 Norman Butler (1918–2011) (div. 1958), m. 1960 Boyd de Brossard (1921–2015), m. 1974 Edward Lee Cave
        - Susan Mary Sheila Winn (1923–2011) m. 1946 Geoffrey Russell, 4th Baron Ampthill (1921–2011)
        - Gawaine Baillie, 7th Baronet (1934–2003) m. Margot Beaubien 1966
      - Dorothy Paget (1905–1960)
    - William Payne Whitney (1876–1927) m. 1902 Helen Julia Hay (1875–1944)
      - Joan Whitney (1903–1975) m. 1924 Charles Shipman Payson (1898–1985)
        - Lorinda Payson (1930–2025) m. 1951 Vincent de Roulet (1925–1975)
      - John Hay Whitney (1904–1982) m. 1931 Mary Elizabeth Altemus (div. 1940), m. 1942 Betsey Roosevelt (née Cushing) (1908–1998)
        - (adopted stepdaughter) Sara Roosevelt Whitney (1932–2001) m. 1953 Anthony di Bonaventura (1929–2012) (div. 1972), m. 1973 Ronald A. Wilford (1927–2015)
    - Dorothy Payne Whitney (1887–1968) m. 1911 Willard Dickerman Straight (1880–1918), m. 1925 Leonard Knight Elmhirst (1893–1974)
      - Whitney Willard Straight (1912–1979) m. 1935 Lady Daphne Margarita Finch-Hatton (1913–2003)
      - Beatrice Whitney Straight (1914–2001) m. 1942 Louis Dolivet (1908–1989) (div. 1949), m. 1949 Peter Cookson (1913–1990)
      - Michael Whitney Straight (1916–2004) m. 1939 Belinda Crompton (1920–2015) (div. 1969), m. 1974 Nina Gore Auchincloss (born 1937), m. 1998 Katharine Gould
        - Dorothy Straight (born 1958)
  - Susan Collins Whitney (1845–1939) m. Henry F. Dimock (1842–1911)
  - Lorinda Collins "Lily" Whitney (1852–1946) m. Charles T. Barney (1851–1907)

== Family network ==
=== Associates ===
People closely aligned with or subordinate to the Whitney family include:

- Henry Lawrence Burnett
- Roscoe Channing
- Merian C. Cooper
- Herbert Croly
- William Lukens Elkins
- Catharine Littlefield Greene
- Daniel Guggenheim
- Daniel S. Lamont
- Oliver Hazard Payne
- Benjamin Franklin Pearson
- Francis A. Pratt
- Benno C. Schmidt Sr.
- David O. Selznick
- Kenneth A. Spencer
- Charles Shipman Payson
- Sherman Pratt
- Thomas Fortune Ryan
- W.E.D. Stokes
- Ilya Andreyevich Tolstoy
- Juan Trippe
- Clarissa Watson
- Peter A.B. Widener
- Langbourne Meade Williams Jr.
- Richard Thornton Wilson Jr.

=== Businesses ===
Companies in which the Whitney family have held a controlling or otherwise substantial interest include:

- American Tobacco Company
- Art in America
- Cataract House Hotel
- Dominion Iron & Steel Company
- Dun & Bradstreet
- Foshalee Plantation
- Freeport Texas Company
- Great Northern Paper
- Greentree Stable
- Hudson Bay Mining & Smelting Company
- International Herald Tribune
- J.H. Whitney & Company
- Manhasset Stable
- Marineland of Florida
- Metropolitan Steamship Company
- Metropolitan Street Railway Company
- Minnesota North Stars
- Minnesota Vikings
- Minute Maid Company
- The New Republic
- New York Herald Tribune
- New York Loan & Improvement Company
- New York Mets
- Pan American World Airways
- Pratt & Whitney Measurement Systems
- Selznick International Pictures
- Spencer Chemical Company
- Standard Oil
- Technicolor Corporation
- West End Street Railway
- Western Airways
- Whitney Armory
- Whitney Real Estate Corporation

=== Philanthropy and non-profit organizations ===
- Almeric Paget Massage Corps
- American Philological Association
- Association of Junior Leagues International
- Country Art Gallery & Art School
- Dartington College of Arts
- Dartington International Summer School
- Greentree Foundation
- Helen Hay Whitney Foundation
- Jockey Club (United States)
- John Hay Whitney Foundation
- Markey Cancer Center
- National Museum of Dance and Hall of Fame
- National Museum of Racing and Hall of Fame
- The New School for Social Research
- North Shore University Hospital
- Payne Whitney Gymnasium
- Payne Whitney Psychiatric Clinic
- Saratoga Performing Arts Center
- Whitney Laboratory for Marine Bioscience
- Whitney South Sea Expedition
- William C. Whitney Foundation
- Whitney Gallery of Western Art
- Whitney Museum of American Art
- Whitney Stakes (NYRA)

== Buildings, estates and historic sites ==
- Belmont Park
- Breuer Building
- Brookdale Farm
- C.V. Whitney Farm
- Dartington Hall
- David Whitney Building
- David Whitney House
- Eli Whitney Gun Factory
- The Elms
- Greentree
- Greenwood Plantation
- Joye Cottage
- Llangollen Farm
- Payne Whitney House
- Saratoga Race Course
- Waters Farm
- Whitney Studio Gallery
- Whitney Pond Park
- Willard Straight Hall
