= Flora Payne Whitney =

American artist and socialite

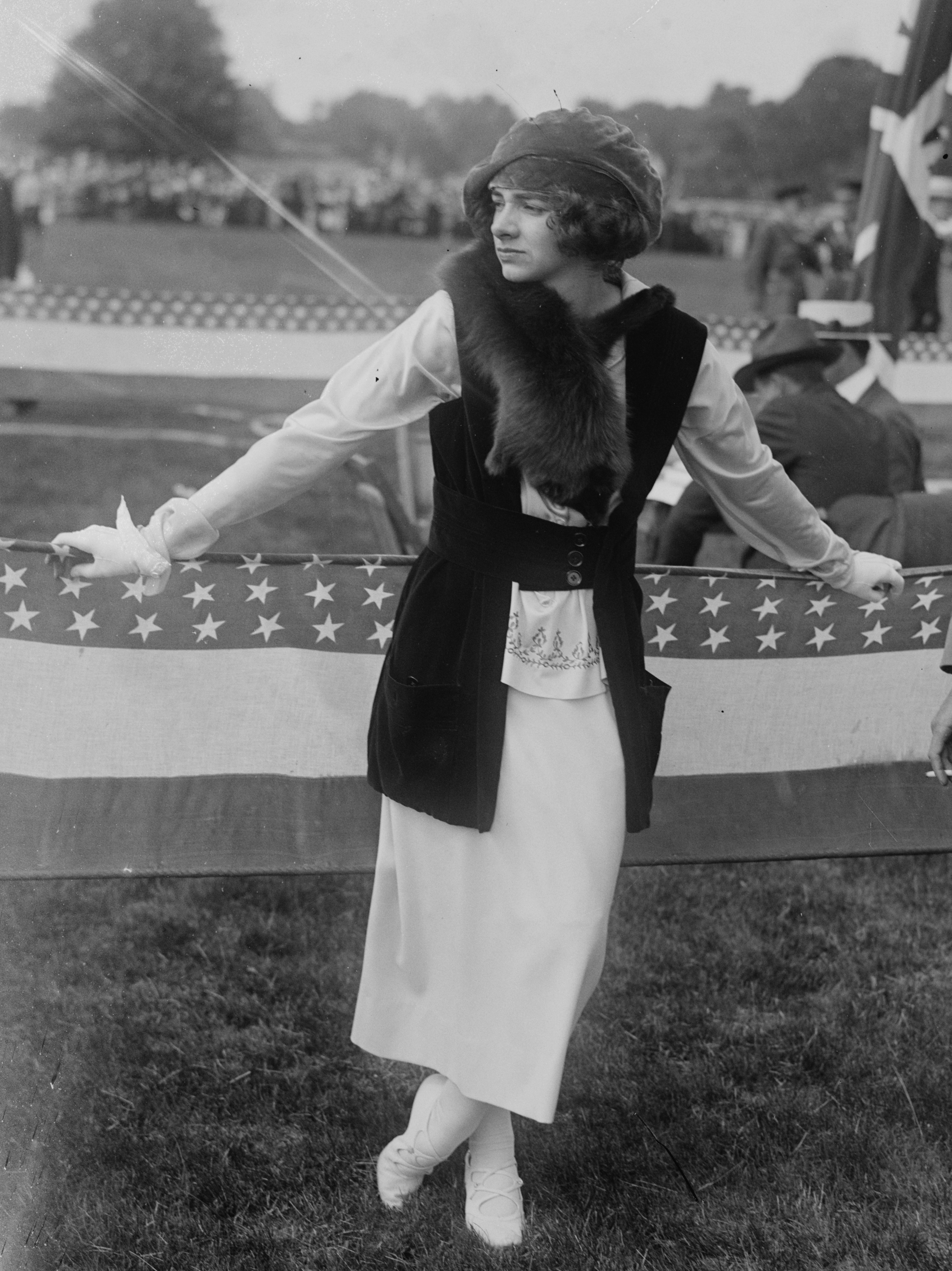
- Born: July 27, 1897; New York City, U.S.
- Died: July 18, 1986 (aged 88); Glen Cove, New York, U.S.
- Education: Brearley School; Foxcroft School
- Occupation: Patron of the arts
- Spouses: Roderick Tower (m. 1920; div. 1925) George Macculloch Miller III (m. 1927; died 1972)
- Children: 4, including Whitney Tower and Flora Miller Biddle
- Parent(s): Harry Payne Whitney; Gertrude Vanderbilt Whitney

Flora Payne Whitney, also known as Flora Whitney Miller (July 27, 1897 – July 18, 1986), was an American artist, socialite, art collector, and patron of the arts.

== Early life ==
Flora Payne Whitney was born on July 27, 1897, and raised in Manhattan. Her father was Harry Payne Whitney (1872–1930), a sportsman and heir to the Whitney family fortune, and her mother was sculptor Gertrude Vanderbilt (1875–1942), heiress to a substantial part of the Vanderbilt family fortune. She attended Brearley School in New York and Foxcroft School in Middleburg, Virginia, where she met and became close lifelong friends with the artist Kay Sage.

== Career ==
During World War I, she worked with Ruth Hanna McCormick, wife of Senator Joseph M. McCormick, at the Washington headquarters of the Republican Women's National Executive Committee.

Whitney worked closely with her mother, Gertrude Vanderbilt Whitney in the founding and endowing of the Whitney Museum of Art in New York. After her mother's death, Whitney served as President of the Museum from 1941 until 1966, and as chairman from 1966 through 1974. Whitney's daughter and granddaughter remain active in museum affairs to this day.

== Personal life ==
On August 4, 1916, Whitney made her debut at "The Reefs," the Payne-Whitney "cottage" in Newport, Rhode Island. She was escorted by Quentin Roosevelt, son of President Theodore Roosevelt, although her father did not approve of young Roosevelt. After the United States entered World War I, Quentin enlisted in the U.S. Army Air Service, and became engaged to Whitney before leaving for duty overseas. The glamorous young couple never married, since Quentin was killed in aerial combat in July, 1918. Love letters exchanged between Flora and Quentin while he was at the front were featured in Edward Renehan's book about TR's sons, The Lion's Pride: Theodore Roosevelt and His Family in Peace and War.

In 1920, Whitney married Roderick Tower at St. Bartholomew's Church, New York. He was an aviator who had trained with Quentin Roosevelt at Mineola air field on Long Island. Tower was also a stockbroker, and son of U.S. Ambassador to Russia and Germany Charlemagne Tower Jr. The marriage was a failure, however, due to Tower's drinking and infidelity. Before their divorce in August 1925, they had two children together:

- Pamela Tower (1921-2013), who married Jay Ketchum Secor (1912–1960) in 1941. They divorced in 1950 and she later married Thomas LeBoutillier (1913–1979)
- Whitney Tower (1923–1999)

In 1927, Whitney married George Macculloch Miller III (d. 1972) in Cairo, Egypt. Miller was an artist and member of the architectural firm of Noel & Miller, from 1930 to 1948, and a grandson of George Macculloch Miller (1832–1917), the founder of what would become the United Hospital Fund. The marriage to "Cully" Miller was long and happy, and Whitney had two more children:

- Flora Miller (b. 1928), who married Michael Henry Irving She later married Sydney Francis Biddle (1918–2004)
- Leverett Saltonstall Miller (b. 1931)

She died on July 18, 1986, at Community Hospital in Glen Cove, New York.

=== Wealth ===
Following her father's death in 1930, Flora inherited $1,000,000 outright from his estate, as well as the income from a Trust valued at approximately $10,500,000, which would be payable to her children after her death. Her mother, Gertrude Vanderbilt Whitney, died in April 1942; although much of Gertrude's fortune was bequeathed to charity, Flora and her two siblings each received a third-share in approximately $1,000,000 worth of real estate which her mother had owned. Gertrude had also enjoyed the income during her lifetime from a $5,000,000 trust fund established in the will of her own father, Cornelius Vanderbilt II; as Gertrude did not exercise her power of appointment over this trust in her own will, the trust vested into the ownership of Flora and her two siblings in equal shares.

=== Descendants ===
Whitney's grandson John LeBoutillier is a political columnist and commentator and a one-term U.S. Representative representing a Long Island district. Her great-grandson, Josiah Hornblower (son of Whitney Tower's daughter, Alexandra Tower Hornblower Thorne) was featured in the documentary Born Rich.

=== Family tree ===
Ancestors of Flora Payne Whitney

16. Stephen Whitney
8. Brig.-Gen. James Scollay Whitney
17. Mary Burgess
4. William Collins Whitney
18. William Collins
9. Laurinda Collins
19. Eunice Parsons
2. Harry Payne Whitney
20. Elisha Payne
10. Henry B. Payne
21. Esther Douglas
5. Flora Payne
22. Nathan Perry
11. Mary Perry
23. Pauline Skinner
1. Flora Payne Whitney
24. Cornelius Vanderbilt
12. William Henry Vanderbilt
25. Sophia Johnson
6. Cornelius Vanderbilt II
26. Rev. Samuel Kissam
13. Maria Louisa Kissam
27. Margaret Hamilton Adams
3. Gertrude Vanderbilt Whitney
28. Maj. David Gwynne
14. Abraham Evan Gwynne
29. Alice Ann Claypoole
7. Alice Claypoole Gwynne
30. Henry Collins Flagg, Jr.
15. Rachel Moore Flagg
31. Martha Whiting
