= Flora Miller Biddle =

American patron of the arts

- Born: Flora Miller; 1928 (age 97–98)
- Education: Barnard College; Manhattanville College
- Occupation: Patron of the arts
- Spouses: Michael Henry Irving (m. 1947; div. 1979) Sydney Francis Biddle (died)
- Children: 4
- Parent(s): Flora Payne Whitney; George Macculloch Miller III
- Family: Whitney family Vanderbilt family

Flora Miller Biddle (born 1928) is an American author, honorary chairman, and former president of the Whitney Museum of American Art, serving from 1977 to 1995. She is a granddaughter of Gertrude Vanderbilt Whitney, the founder of the Whitney Museum.

== Biography ==
Biddle was born to Flora Payne Whitney, a daughter of Gertrude Vanderbilt Whitney and Harry Payne Whitney. Gertrude was a great-granddaughter of Commodore Cornelius Vanderbilt while Harry was a son of William Collins Whitney, former United States Secretary of the Navy in the first Cleveland administration, and a descendant of Eli Whitney, inventor of the Cotton gin.

She attended Barnard College but dropped out in 1947 to marry Michael Henry Irving (1923-2003), a Harvard graduate who served in the Navy. He later received a degree from Columbia Graduate School of Architecture, Planning and Preservation and became an architect. Irving was the son of Carolyn Mann Irving (1891-1987) and Evelyn duPont Irving (1886-1968), a nephew of Washington Irving and descendant of Éleuthère Irénée du Pont, founder of the DuPont company. They married in June 1947 and had four children.

She became a museum trustee in 1958 and president of the Whitney in 1977. During her tenure as president of the Whitney Museum of American Art, she worked closely with director Thomas N. Armstrong III to expand the museum's modern art collection and was responsible for the fundraising. Biddle once rode in the trunk of a Ringling Bros. and Barnum & Bailey Circus elephant on Madison Avenue in a nationally publicized stunt to help acquire Cirque Calder into the museum's permanent collection. She also oversaw the moving of the museum into the Marcel Breuer-designed structure on 945 Madison Avenue on the Upper East Side.

Biddle obtained her degree from Manhattanville College in 1978. From 1980 to 1990, she served on the New York City Art Commission.

She divorced Irving in 1979 and married Sydney Francis Biddle (1918-2004), a lawyer turned artist trained at Harvard College and Columbia Law School. Biddle was a member of the Biddle family of Philadelphia and a nephew of Francis Biddle, who was Attorney General of the United States during World War II and the main American judge during the Nuremberg trials.

She stepped down as president and chairman during the mid-1990s. Her daughter, Fiona Donovan, a Barnard College and Columbia University-trained art historian, served as trustee until 2003. Donovan was brought back to the board in 2014 by director Adam D. Weinberg. Biddle's granddaughters, fifth-generation members of the Whitney family, Flora Donovan and Flora Irving, were also made trustees of the Whitney in the same year.

== Written works ==
- The Whitney Women and the Museum They Made: A Family Memoir, Arcade Publishing, 1999
- Embers of Childhood: Growing Up a Whitney, Arcade Publishing, 2019
