= Whitney Tower =

American horse racing journalist

- Born: June 30, 1923; Roslyn, New York, U.S.
- Died: February 11, 1999 (aged 75); Saratoga Springs, New York, U.S.
- Education: St. George's School; Harvard College
- Occupations: Horse racing media President of the National Museum of Racing and Hall of Fame
- Spouses: Frances Cheston Train; Joan Baker Spear; Lucy Niblack Lyle
- Children: 6
- Parent(s): Flora Payne Whitney; Roderick Tower

Whitney Tower (June 30, 1923 – February 11, 1999) was an American journalist reporting on Thoroughbred horse racing and a president of the National Museum of Racing and Hall of Fame.

== Career ==
From 1948 to 1954, Tower worked as a sports reporter for The Cincinnati Enquirer. He then joined the fledgling Sports Illustrated magazine where he served as horse racing editor for twenty-two years, during which time he received the National Thoroughbred Racing Association's magazine writing award.

In 1976, Tower, along with E. Barry Ryan, founded Classic magazine, a publication dedicated to Thoroughbred and Standardbred racing as well as show jumping events. The magazine reported on horse racing matters not only from North America but from around the world as well, and won Media Eclipse Awards in 1976-77. Following the magazine's closure, Tower joined the National Museum of Racing in Saratoga Springs, New York, serving as its president from 1982 to 1989 and for ten years was chairman of the Museum's Hall of Fame committee.

== Personal life ==
Whitney Tower and his first wife, Frances Cheston Train, had four children:

- Alexandra "Alix" Tower Thorne, formerly married to Daniel Kempner Thorne, also previously married to Jonathan Marshall Hornblower.
- Whitney Tower Jr.
- Frances Tower-Thacher, widow of the late construction fraud lawyer, Thomas "Toby" Thacher II.
- Harry Payne Tower, who married Hilary Harlow.

With his third wife, Lucy Niblack Lyle Tower had two more children: Aurora and Alfred Tower.

In 1968, Tower married Joan Baker Spear, the former wife of Life photographer Eliot Elisofon. Tower spent time writing articles in Aiken, South Carolina, home to the Aiken Steeplechase Association and famous for the flat racing and steeplechase Thoroughbred horses that trained at The Aiken Training Track. He and his wife decided to make Aiken their home and moved into a mansion called Joye Cottage built at the beginning of the 20th century by great-grandfather William Collins Whitney. While living there, the couple became instrumental in the creation of the Aiken Thoroughbred Racing Hall of Fame and Museum.

Whitney Tower was a resident of Saratoga Springs, where he died in 1999 of complications from a stroke. He was survived by his third wife, Lucy Niblack Lyle.
