= Timothy Dimock =

American politician

Timothy Dimock, MD

Member of the Connecticut Senate
- In office January 1, 1846 – December 31, 1846

Member of the Connecticut House of Representatives
- In office January 1, 1838 – December 31, 1838

Personal details
- Born: April 17, 1799 Coventry, Connecticut
- Died: April 29, 1874 (aged 75) South Coventry, Connecticut
- Resting place: Nathan Hale Cemetery
- Spouse(s): Mary Ann Moody (m. 1826; died 1838) Laura Farnam Booth (m. 1839; died 1872)
- Children: 4
- Education: Yale Medical School

Military service
- Unit: Connecticut Militia

Timothy Dimock (April 17, 1799 – April 29, 1874) was an American medical doctor and politician who was the father or prominent lawyer and businessman Henry F. Dimock.

== Early life and career ==
Dimock was born on April 17, 1799, in Coventry, Connecticut, to Daniel Dimick (1765–1833) and Anna Wright (1766–1832). He had eight siblings. Dimock graduated from Yale Medical School in 1823.

He practiced medicine in Coventry since taking his degree. In 1846, he was a member of the Connecticut State Senate, and ex officio one of the Corporation of Yale College.

He was a member of the Connecticut House of Representatives in 1838 and the Senate in 1846. During the 1850s and 1860s, he served as surgeon for parts of Connecticut's militia, empowered to grant medical waivers for exemption of duty.

== Personal life ==
On June 29, 1826, Dimock married Mary Ann Moody (1810–1838). Together they had a daughter.

After Moody's death in 1838, he married Laura Farnam Booth (1819–1872) on May 8, 1839. Together they had:

- Mary Elizabeth Dimock (1840–1842)
- Henry F. Dimock (1842–1911), who married Susan Collins Whitney, daughter of James Scollay Whitney (1811–1878) of the prominent Whitney family
- Maria Farnam Dimock (1843–1861)

He died in South Coventry, Conn., April 29, 1874, and is buried at the Nathan Hale Cemetery in Coventry, Connecticut.

=== Honors ===
The Booth & Dimock Memorial Library in Coventry is named for him and Reverend Chauncey Booth. His son, Henry, who died on April 10, 1911, left $40,000 (equivalent to $1,382,000 in 2025) to the South Coventry Library Association to build the Booth and Dimock Memorial Library, named for his father and grandfather.
