= Greentree =

- Interactive map of the Greentree area

General information
- Type: Estate
- Location: Manhasset, Long Island, New York
- Coordinates: 40°47′23″N 73°41′32″W
- Opened: 1904
- Owner: Payne Whitney (original); Greentree Foundation (current)

Greentree is a 400-acre (1.6 km^{2}) estate in Manhasset, on Long Island, New York. The estate was constructed for businessman Payne Whitney in 1904 and was owned by members of the Whitney family for much of the 20th century. It is currently owned by the Greentree Foundation, a philanthropic nonprofit organization.

== History ==
Payne Whitney purchased the estate for his bride, Helen Julia Hay, in 1904. As with other Gold Coast mansions, the original estate was pieced together. The five family farms that were purchased to make up the new estate were the Mitchell, Ketchum, Brinkerhoff, Skidmore, and Schenck farms.

Later, John Hay Whitney and his second wife, Betsey, occupied the main house, where Mrs. Whitney remained in residence there until her death in 1998. Radio and TV talk show pioneers John Reagan ("Tex" McCrary) and his wife, model and movie star Jinx Falkenburg, intermittently lived on the Jock Whitney estate with their sons from 1947 to 1977.

The estate was later divided, with gifts of land being made to several organizations.

- The North Shore Unitarian Universalist Society, now known as the Unitarian Universalist Congregation at Shelter Rock (UUCSR), received a portion adjacent to Shelter Rock Road and has built a large Worship Hall on the site of the former Apple Orchard. The old clay real tennis court was removed at that time.
- North Shore Manhasset Hospital also received a donation of property adjacent to Community Drive. John Hay Whitney was an honorary member of the Manhasset-Lakeville Fire Department, and donated the land along Community Drive East to be the site of the M.L.F.D. Company Two fire house, and Nassau County Police Department's Sixth Precinct.

The remaining 408 acres – including the family home – are run by the Greentree Foundation, as a conference center dedicated to international justice and human rights issues. The Greentree Foundation was founded in 1982 by Betsey Cushing Roosevelt Whitney, and has owned the property since 2000. In 2004 the Greentree Foundation auctioned impressionist and modern artworks from the Whitney collection at Sothebys.

The estate has hosted the Manhasset negotiations, a round of talks between Morocco and the Polisario Front, August 10–12, 2007, as part of a set of UN-led meetings centering on the future of Western Sahara, among others.

== See also ==
- Shelter Rock (North Hills, New York)
- North Shore University Hospital
