= William Payne Whitney =

American businessman (1876–1927)

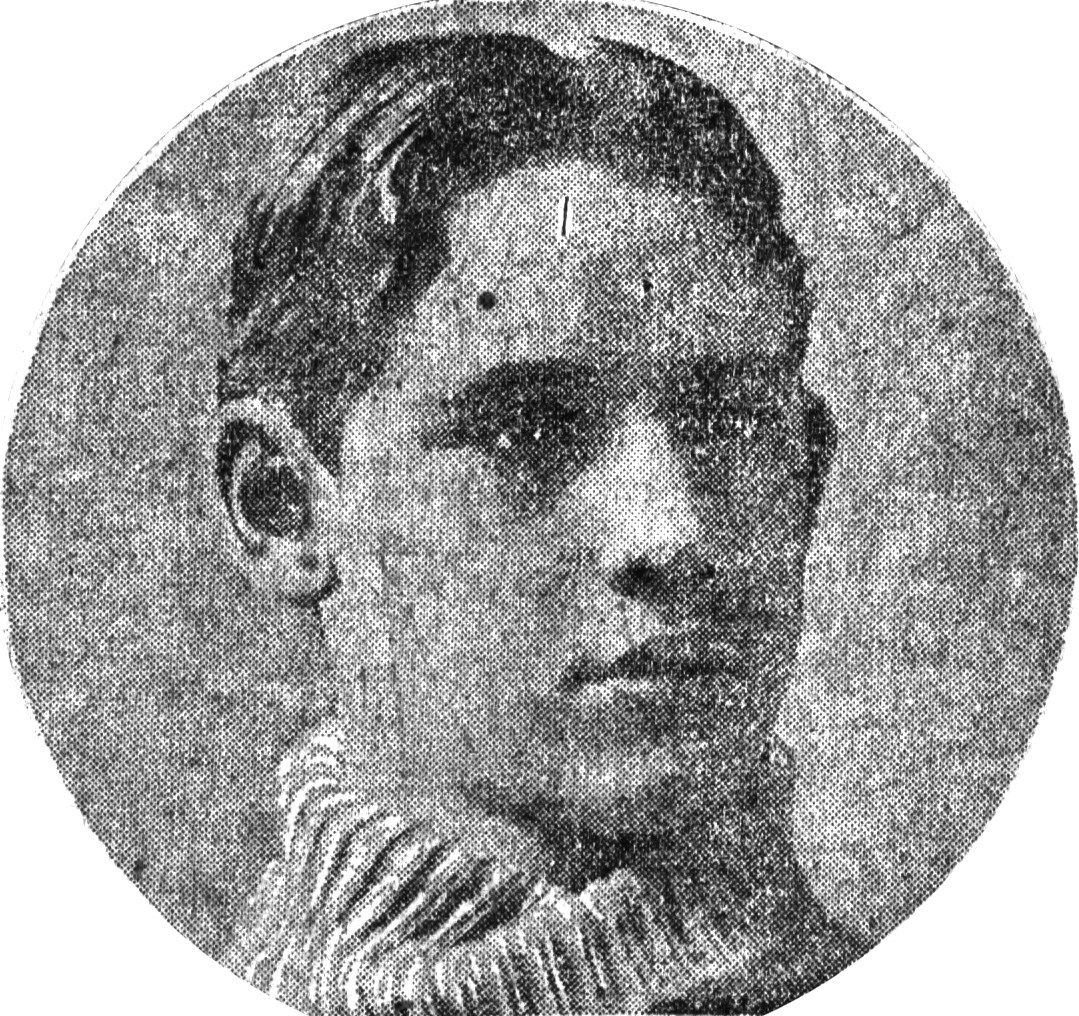
- William Payne Whitney, c. 1899
- Born: William Payne Whitney; March 20, 1876; New York City, U.S.
- Died: May 25, 1927 (aged 51); Manhasset, New York, U.S.
- Education: Yale University; Harvard Law School
- Occupations: Investor, racehorse owner/breeder, philanthropist
- Spouse: Helen Julia Hay (m. 1902)
- Children: Joan Whitney; John Hay Whitney
- Parent(s): William Collins Whitney; Flora Payne
- Relatives: See Whitney family

William Payne Whitney (March 20, 1876 – May 25, 1927) was an American businessman and member of the influential Whitney family. He inherited a fortune and enlarged it through business dealings, then devoted much of his money and efforts to a wide variety of philanthropic purposes. His will included funds to expand the New York Hospital, now called NewYork-Presbyterian Hospital, where the Payne Whitney Psychiatric Clinic was established.

== Early life ==
William Payne Whitney was born on March 20, 1876, to William Collins Whitney (1841–1904) and Flora Payne (1842–1893). His siblings included: elder brother Harry Payne Whitney (1872–1930), Pauline Payne Whitney (1874–1916), and younger sister Dorothy Payne Whitney (1887–1968).

After his mother's death and his father's remarriage (of which he apparently disapproved), Whitney essentially dropped the first name he shared with his father, and became commonly known simply as Payne Whitney. This choice is reflected in the form of his name associated with several of his philanthropic endeavors.

Whitney was educated at the Groton School. He attended Yale College, where he was a member of Skull and Bones and Delta Kappa Epsilon, and captained the Yale rowing team. After graduating in 1898, Whitney then studied law at the Harvard Law School, receiving his Bachelor of Laws in 1901.

== Career ==
In addition to a substantial inheritance from his father, William inherited $63,000,000 from his uncle, Col. Oliver Hazard Payne. Amongst his many investments, he possessed major holdings in banking, tobacco, railroads, mining and oil. He was also a member of the board of directors and/or an executive officer of several large corporations, including the City Bank New York, and the Great Northern Paper Company, and the Northern Finance Corporation.

=== Equestrianism ===
A horse racing enthusiast in the tradition of his father and brother, William's Greentree Stable, named for their Long Island estate, was a very significant racing and breeding operation for thoroughbred horses.

=== Philanthropy ===
Throughout his life, William Payne Whitney was involved in philanthropic work for a variety of causes. A trustee of the New York Public Library, in 1923 he gave the library $12,000,000. Whitney made charitable contributions to the rowing team at his alma mater, Yale University, including donating funds to build a dormitory for the crew.

His will bequeathed more than $20 million to establish the Payne Whitney Psychiatric Clinic at Cornell University's medical school, now called Weill Cornell Medicine, and New York Hospital, now New York–Presbyterian Hospital in New York City.

Smaller amounts to other educational and medical institutions. Although he had contributed $1,000,000 to the Yale Endowment Fund shortly before his death, sufficient estate funds were given to enable Yale's construction of the 9½ story Payne Whitney Gymnasium that too was completed in 1932. As a tribute to him, a road in Manhasset was named after him, Payne Whitney Lane.

== Personal life ==
In 1902, Whitney married Helen Julia Hay (1875–1944), the daughter of then-United States Secretary of State (and former U.S. Ambassador to the United Kingdom) John Hay. Their Stanford White-designed mansion, Payne Whitney House at 972 Fifth Avenue, was a wedding gift from his maternal uncle, Oliver Hazard Payne. The couple also had an estate, Greentree, in Manhasset, New York. Together, they had two children:

- Joan Whitney Payson (1903–1975), who was the first owner of the New York Mets Major League Baseball team.
- John Hay Whitney (1904–1982), who served as the United States Ambassador to the United Kingdom.

On September 20, 1911, Whitney was aboard the RMS Olympic when it was rammed by the warship HMS Hawke. Olympic was the sister ship of the RMS Titanic.

Whitney died in 1927 at his Greentree estate.
