= Asa Whitney =

American businessman (1797–1872)

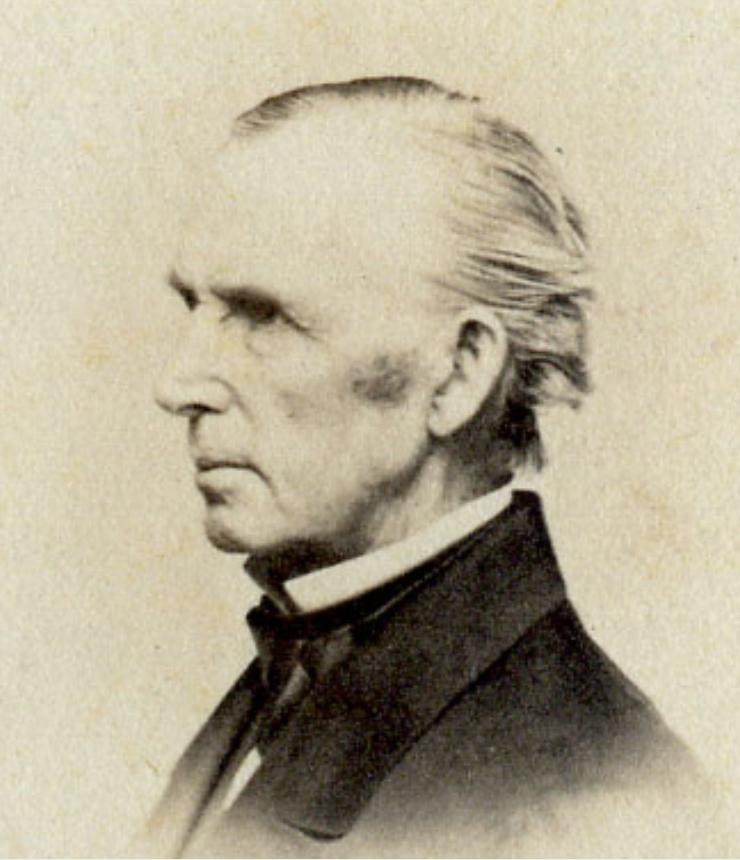
- Born: March 14, 1797; Groton, Connecticut, U.S.
- Died: September 7, 1872 (aged 75); Washington, D.C., U.S.
- Resting place: Rock Creek Cemetery, Washington, D.C., U.S.
- Occupation: Businessman
- Spouses: Herminie Antoinette Pillet (m. 1832; died 1833) Sarah Jay Munro (died 1840) Catherine (Moore) Campbell (m. 1840)
- Relatives: Whitney family

Asa Whitney (1797–1872) was a dry-goods merchant and one of the first promoters of an American transcontinental railroad. A trip to China in 1842–44 impressed upon Whitney the need for a railroad from the Atlantic to the Pacific.

When Whitney returned to the United States in 1844, he realized the benefits from such an undertaking, and spent a great deal of money trying to get the Congress to take up the project. In 1849, he published "A Project for a Railroad to the Pacific". For years he continued to write revised memorials and take expeditions through what was then known as Indian Territory to support his cause.

Whitney lived to see the opening of the Pacific Railroad in 1869.

== Early life ==
Asa Whitney was born on March 14, 1797, in North Groton, Connecticut. His parents were Sarah Mitchell and Shubael Whitney. He is distantly related to Eli Whitney, the inventor of the cotton gin: they were fifth cousins. For five generations, the Whitney family had been farmers. However, from a young age, Asa Whitney showed no interest in agriculture and wanted to be a merchant.

== Career ==
Whitney went to New York in his late teens to chase his dream of being a merchant. He began as a clerk, working for a huge importer of French goods. He was promoted, and, by 1832, he was a successful dry-goods merchant.

== Marriages ==
While he was abroad in France in 1832, he married a French girl, Herminie Antoinette Pillet. However, just a mere year after they met, she died on March 31, 1833. She was buried in New Rochelle, very close to where Whitney had planned to start a family with her. He married again to Sarah Jay Munro, a daughter of Peter Jay Munro. She died on November 12, 1840. This may have been a miscarriage or an unsuccessful childbirth. She was buried next to Whitney’s first wife.

In 1852, Whitney married Mrs. Catherine (Moore) Campbell of Wilmington, North Carolina She outlived her husband by six years and is buried beside him in Rock Creek Cemetery, Washington, D.C.

== Trip to China ==
After his second wife died, his property in New York faced foreclosure and was put up for auction. Whitney was only given $10,000 for his property. He sold the rest of his land and drew his interests toward China. On June 18, 1842, he set sail to China on his ship, the Oscar. The Oscar was loaded down with a lot of goods which resulted in the ship moving very slowly. The voyage to China usually took around 100 days, and newer ships could make the trip in as short as 79 days. However, Whitney’s trip took 153 days, a record slowness for the year. Whitney became very angry during this trip and he was apt to having rages and temper tantrums. He arrived in China during the Opium War between the British and the Chinese. After the war, which weakened China, other nations were given trade concessions with China, and Whitney was one of the Americans involved with the exportation of teas, spices, and other goods. His profits began piling up. By the time he left China, he had enough money to retire. His time in China lasted a year and four months, and he headed back home on April 2, 1844. His trip back was also very long and tedious.

== Promotion of a transcontinental railroad ==
On the way back from China, Asa Whitney began devising a plan that would make the trip to China much easier. He wanted to build a railroad across the United States. People on the East coast could take the train to the West coast, and then take a ship from there to China. It would greatly shorten the long trip. When he arrived back in the United States, he was full of inspiration and drive and he got straight to work. He bought property in upstate New York and began working on a memorial to Congress about his plan for a railroad. His plan was mainly focused on trade with China, and connecting the two countries for increased culture, immigration, and commerce. He believed that the railroad would open trade to all of Asia, and unite the continents. He spent a great amount of time and money to try to promote his plan, and he explored a lot of the routes that he considered. He wrote A Project for a Railroad to the Pacific, a memorial to the United States Congress, in 1849. His plan was detailed and impressive, but he was denied. He continued trying to create the railroad, taking surveys and examining potential routes. He wanted to create a route that went way up north to the Puget Sound. However, no matter how hard he tried, his plan was never accepted, and he stopped campaigning in 1851.

== Death ==
Asa Whitney lived long enough to see his dream become a reality; he was alive when the first transcontinental railroad was completed. He died in 1872, three years after the golden spike was laid, of typhoid fever.

== Legacy ==
Although Whitney’s plan fell through, word began spreading of the idea of a transcontinental railroad. His plan inspired many young, ambitious engineers, one of whom was Theodore Judah, a man who helped make the transcontinental railroad a reality.

Whitney Avenue in Washington, D.C., was named after Whitney. It was later renamed Park Road.
