= Helen Hay Whitney =

American poet (1875–1944)

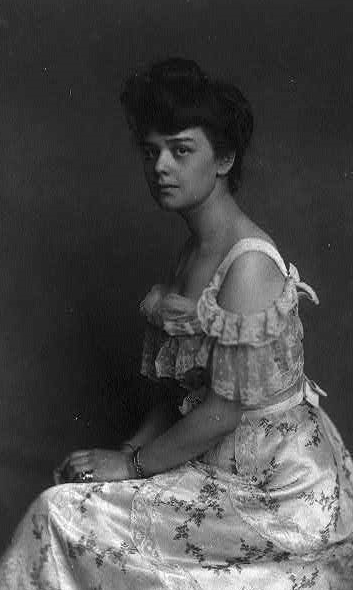
- Whitney photographed by Frances Benjamin Johnston
- Born: Helen Julia Hay; March 11, 1875; United States
- Died: September 24, 1944 (aged 69); New York City, United States
- Occupations: Poet; author; racehorse owner/breeder; philanthropist
- Political party: Republican Party
- Spouse: Payne Whitney (m. 1902; died 1927)
- Children: Joan Whitney Payson; John Hay Whitney
- Parent(s): John Milton Hay; Clara Louise Stone
- Relatives: Amasa Stone (grandfather); Flora Stone Mather (aunt)
- Honors: U.S. Racing Hall of Fame – Pillars of the Turf (2019)

Helen Julia Hay Whitney (March 11, 1875 – September 24, 1944) was an American poet, writer, racehorse owner and breeder, socialite, and philanthropist. She was a member by marriage of the prominent Whitney family of New York.

== Early life ==
Hay was born in 1875 (although some sources say 1876), the daughter of John Milton Hay (1838–1905), who served as United States Secretary of State and the United States Ambassador to Great Britain, and Clara Louise Stone (1849–1914). Her maternal grandfather was Cleveland multimillionaire railroad and banking mogul Amasa Stone (1818–1883).

== Career ==
=== Poet ===
Helen Hay was a poet and an author of books for children. A number of her poems were published in Harper's Magazine. One of her poems, Love of the Rose, was used in Leon Ardin's opera, Antony and Cleopatra (Act 2, no. 15). Herbs And Apples (1910) is a collection of poems that she published using what she had given for The Metropolitan Magazine and Collier's Weekly. "Songs and Sonnets", "Gypsy Verses" are also some of her works produced in such a manner. Several of her works have been republished in the 21st century.

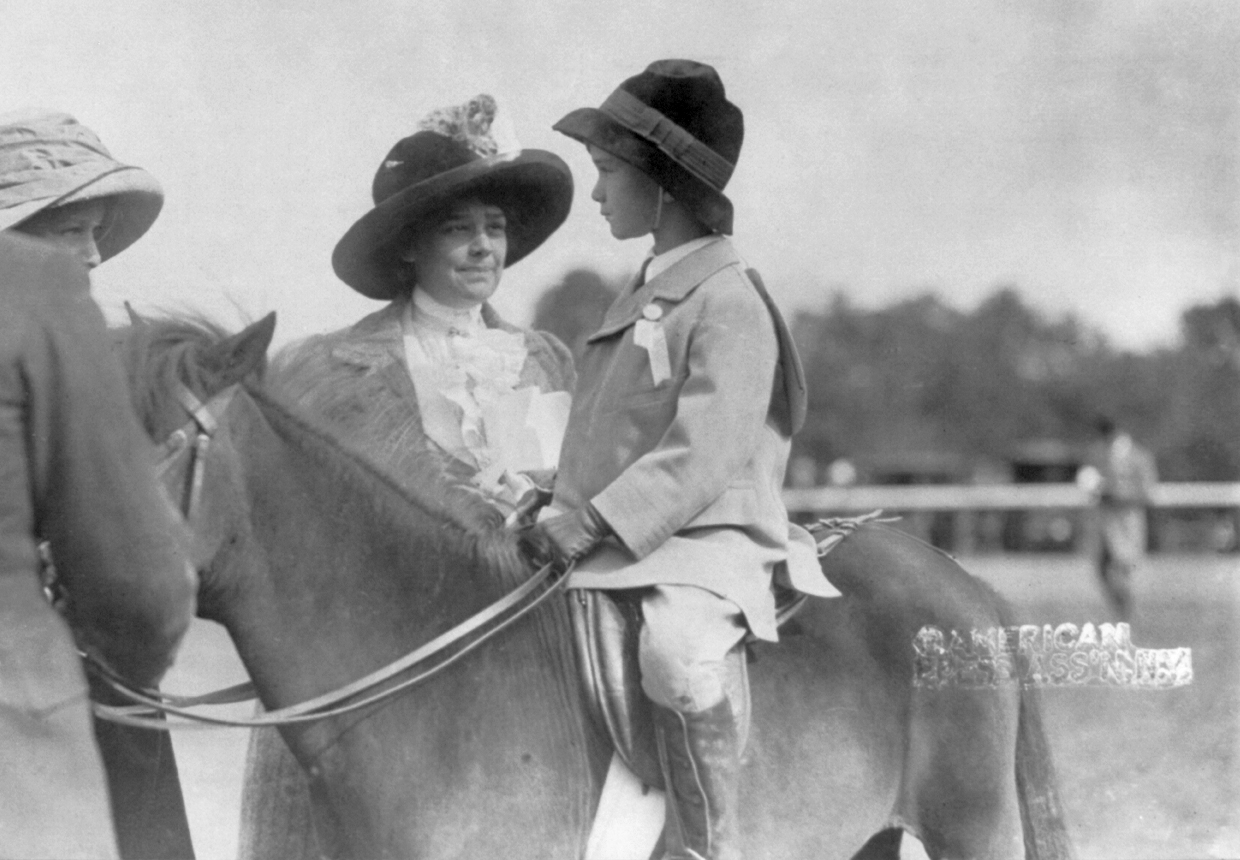
Helen Hay Whitney and her six-year-old son, John Hay Whitney (October 12, 1910)

=== Horse racing ===
After her husband's death in 1927, she continued to manage Greentree, and Greentree Stable, and it continued to be a major force in Thoroughbred flat and steeplechase horse racing. Her horses won the American Grand National steeplechase in 1926, 1927, 1928, and 1937. In flat racing, her horses Twenty Grand and Shut Out won the Kentucky Derby and Belmont Stakes in 1931 and 1942, respectively.

Twenty Grand, named American Horse of the Year in 1931, inspired a cigarette brand put out by Axton-Fisher Tobacco Co., which led to a 1936 trademark infringement case it won. The trademark battled over by was the name "Twenty Grand"/"20 Grand" and a depiction of a horse's head.

Shut Out was bested for the American Horse of the Year in 1942 by 1941 Triple Crown winner Whirlaway, when Whirlaway repeated after winning the title in 1941.

In 2019, Helen Hay Whitney was posthumously given the industry's highest honor with induction into the National Museum of Racing and Hall of Fame as one of its Pillars of the Turf.

=== Philanthropy ===
The beneficiary of a large fortune on the death of her husband, Helen Whitney provided substantial funding to various causes and institutions including the Payne Whitney Gymnasium at Yale University. In 1943, an ailing Helen Whitney and her daughter Joan created the Helen Hay Whitney Foundation which supports early postdoctoral research training in all basic biomedical sciences.

== Personal life ==
In 1902, she married Payne Whitney, the son of William Collins Whitney (1841–1904) and Flora Payne (1842–1893). Together, Helen and Payne had a daughter and a son:

- Joan Whitney (1903–1975), who was the first owner of the New York Mets Major League Baseball team.
- John Hay Whitney (1904–1982), who served as the United States Ambassador to the United Kingdom

The couple built a home at 972 Fifth Avenue in New York City designed by Stanford White. Helen Hay Whitney lived there until her death in 1944. The government of France acquired the property in 1952 and it is part of the French Embassy in the United States. The Whitneys also owned a 438-acre (1.77 km^{2}) estate in Manhasset, New York they called Greentree.

Helen Whitney died in 1944 and as part of her bequests left the Metropolitan Museum of Art twenty-four objects consisting of paintings, ceramics, textiles, and furniture.

== See also ==
- Juliana R. Force
