= Metropolitan Steamship Company =

The Metropolitan Steamship Company was for 75 years one of the chief transportation links between New York City and Boston, Massachusetts. It was closely associated with the Whitney family until its acquisition by Charles W. Morse in 1906. Even after being merged into Eastern Steamship Lines, it was maintained as a distinct service, the Metropolitan Line, until 1941.

== Metropolitan Steamship Company ==
=== Early history ===
The Metropolitan Steamship Company was established by Boston business interests soon after the end of the American Civil War in 1866 to operate steamships on the "outside route" between Boston and New York City around Cape Cod. The company was organized in February 1866 by Peter Butler, James B. Taft, Thomas Clyde, Brigadier General James Scollay Whitney, and Whitney's elder son, Henry Melville Whitney. One of the objectives of the investors was to place in remunerative service vessels they owned which were presently idle. James S. Whitney, who had been collector of customs for the Port of Boston in 1860–61, was elected president; Henry M. Whitney was named agent at Boston. Other members of the family eventually became financially interested in the company, including Whitney's younger son, William Collins Whitney, and his sons-in-law, Henry F. Dimock and Charles T. Barney.

Service was inaugurated in 1866 by Captain George L. Norton with the steamer Ashland, a wooden propeller of 843 gross tons, built in 1853 at Philadelphia and owned by Thomas Clyde. The Ashland was soon followed into service by the Jersey Blue, City of Bath, Mary Sanford, Salvor, Relief, Miami, Monticello and Fairbanks. Oldest of these was the Jersey Blue, a 368-ton, 133-foot wooden propeller built in 1850 at Newark, New Jersey. All were propellers except the Miami, a sidewheeler built in 1861–62 by the Philadelphia Navy Yard as the gunboat USS Miami and sold for mercantile use in 1865. The line's New York offices were at first located at the foot of Catherine Street, East River, but soon moved to Pier 10, North River, where they remained for nearly half a century.

In December 1866 the wooden propellers Nereus, Glaucus and Neptune were purchased from the failed Merchants' Steamship Company. Built in 1864, each was a vessel of 1,800 tons and measured 228 feet in length with a beam of 40 feet. Their hulls had to be strengthened, as they had been built for the more protected waters of Long Island Sound, not the open seas beyond Point Judith. Simple expansion steam engines gave a speed of 13 knots.

=== Iron steamships ===
The line's first iron-hulled propeller, the General Whitney, was built in 1873 by Harlan & Hollingsworth at Wilmington, Delaware. A vessel of 1,848 tons, she measured 227 feet in length with a beam of 40 feet, and was propelled by two-cylinder compound engines. All of the company's iron steamers were designed by Herman Winter, the line's chief engineer from 1872 to 1891.

Upon the death of James Whitney on October 24, 1878, Henry Whitney was elected his successor as president of the steamship line. In addition, he retained the office of agent at Boston.

In 1884 the 2,625-toon iron propeller H.F. Dimock was built by William Cramp & Sons at Philadelphia and named for the line's New York agent. A similar 2,625-ton, 274-foot iron propeller, the Herman Winter, was built by Cramps in 1887. Both had two-cylinder compound engines. With the construction of the 2,706-ton, 288-foot H.M. Whitney, powered by triple expansion engines at the Cramp shipyard in 1890, the line possessed four modern iron propellers – the General Whitney, H.F. Dimock, Herman Winter and H.M. Whitney, and the older wooden propellers Glaucus and Neptune (the Nereus having been lost while a barge).

=== Into the 20th century ===
While on her customary route from New York to Boston the steamer H.F. Dimock collided with William K. Vanderbilt's yacht, the Alva, in the Pollock Rip Slough, a narrow channel of Vineyard Sound, on July 24, 1892, sinking the Alva. Captain Henry Morrison of the Alva filed suit against the H.F. Dimock, but both the United States District Court for Massachusetts and the United States Supreme Court ruled against him.

The H.M. Whitney was involved in a serious accident while still in harbor on September 28, 1892. While bound from Boston to New York, at 7 p.m. the H.M. Whitney was run down and sunk in Boston harbor by the transatlantic steamer Ottoman of the Warren Line, bound from Liverpool to Boston. There were no deaths, and the H.M. Whitney was refloated and reconditioned for further service

In 1893 the firm of Flint & Company purchased the steamer El Cid of the Morgan Line and outfitted her as an auxiliary cruiser named Nichtheroy (sold to United States Navy and renamed as USS Buffalo) for service in the Brazilian Civil War of 1893–94. At one point it was reported that Flint & Company wished to purchase the H.F. Dimock or Herman Winter from Metropolitan, but nothing came of it.

The Glaucus and Neptune were withdrawn from service in 1893 and laid up at Brooklyn, New York, where they remained until July 1906, when they were finally towed to Boston for breaking up.

In 1898 the General Whitney was chartered by the Morgan Line for service between New Orleans and New York. While carrying copper ingots and barrel molasses she sprang a leak and sank off St. Augustine, Florida, on April 23, 1899. Lifeboats were launched, but as they came ashore in the surf one capsized, drowning Captain Hawthrone and 16 men.

When the Joy Steamship Company established its New York City-Providence, Rhode Island service in 1899, the company also instituted freight-only service between New York and Boston. The Joy Line was acquired by the New York, New Haven and Hartford Railroad in 1906, ending its freight service to Boston.

On January 23, 1900, the Herman Winter was bound from New York to Boston when she collided with the freighter Ardendhu of the Munson Line off Robinson's Hole, Vineyard Sound. The Ardendhu sank with the loss of two crew members, but the Herman Winter brought 29 survivors into Vineyard Haven.

In 1900 the 2,707-ton, 278-foot steamer James S. Whitney was built to replace the lost General Whitney. Built by Harlan & Hollingsworth at Wilmington, this modern steel propeller was powered by triple expansion engines.

The annual passenger season for the line was from May to November. In 1903 the line's steamers left India Wharf, Boston, for New York daily at 4 p.m. The evening sailing in the opposite direction from New York was from Pier 14, North River.

=== Charles W. Morse gains control ===
Originally chartered in Massachusetts, the Metropolitan Steamship Company was reincorporated in May 1905 in Maine. In 1906 Whitney and his associates sold a controlling interest in the company to Charles W. Morse of the Eastern Steamship Company. Whitney later said this was the worst mistake he ever made. Morse organized the Consolidated Steamship Company in January 1907 as a holding company for Metropolitan as well as Eastern Steamship Company, Clyde Steamship Company and Mallory Steamship Company. Despite an initial announcement of such a sale, Morse failed in his attempt to purchase the Long Island Sound fleet of the New York, New Haven and Hartford. He did, however, acquire control of the New York and Cuba Mail Steamship Company and the New York and Porto Rico Steamship Company in 1907.

In 1906–07 the steamers Harvard and Yale were built by the Delaware River Iron Shipbuilding & Engine Works (the operator of the old John Roach shipyard) at Chester, Pennsylvania, for a Metropolitan subsidiary, the Metropolitan Steamship Company of New Jersey. Each of the 3,731-ton steel propellers measured 407 feet in length with a beam of 61 feet, and had accommodations for 987 overnight passengers. Amongst the first American ships to be fitted with steam turbines, the two ships had a maximum speed of 24 knots and upon entering service were the fastest American-flagged vessels afloat.

Owing to the highly leveraged nature of his financing, the Morse business empire crashed in the Panic of 1907. The Metropolitan Steamship Company went into receivership in February 1908.

The H.M. Whitney was outbound from New York to Boston with passengers and freight when a failure of her steering gear caused her to run aground in the Hell Gate channel of the East River on the afternoon of May 23, 1908. After floating off on a rising tide, she anchored in mid-channel, where her lights were concealed by a heavy fog that lay over the river and Long Island Sound all that evening and night. Fortunately, damage was minor, and she was able to proceed when the fog cleared.

During 1907 three modern steamers, the Massachusetts, Bunker Hill and Old Colony, had been built by Cramps at Philadelphia as package freighters for the Maine Steamship Company, a New Haven subsidiary. Each of the 4,029-ton steel propellers measured 395 feet in length with a beam of 52 feet three inches. The Massachusetts and Bunker Hill were propelled by steam turbines while the Old Colony had reciprocating engines. They were running between New York, Boston and Portland on what was called the Boston Merchants' Line when Charles Sanger Mellen of the New Haven sold a controlling interest in the trio to Morse in 1908.

In the meantime, Morse had been indicted for his role in precipitating the Panic of 1907. He was sentenced to federal prison in November 1908 for violation of federal banking laws but remained free on appeal until January 1910.

=== Corporate restructuring ===
On March 10, 1909, the H.F. Dimock, bound from New York to Boston, and the coastwise steamer Horatio Hall of the Maine Steamship Company collided in the eastern Vineyard Sound shortly after 8 a.m. while sailing at half speed in a heavy fog. The accident occurred in Pollock Rip Slue, not far from where the H.F. Dimock had collided with the Alva in 1892. Captain John A. Thompson of the H.F. Dimock brought his vessel alongside the Horatio Hall so that the latter's five passengers could be transferred.

The Horatio Hall sank at the edge of the channel. Most of her crew left in lifeboats and were picked up by the H.F. Dimock, but Captain W. Frank Jewell, the pilot, first mate, and two seamen remained in the pilot house, which remained a few feet above water. (They were picked up later.) The H.F. Dimock left the scene at 11:15 a.m. and sailed slowly toward Orleans Life-Saving Station, where she was beached. The passengers and crew were removed by the lifesavers under Captain James H. Charles. Moderately damaged, the H.F. Dimock was later hauled off the beach and towed to shipyard for repairs.

On October 8, 1909, Metropolitan's assets were sold at foreclosure sale to John W. McKinnon of Chicago. The company was reincorporated in Maine on October 11, 1909, with Morse as president, McKinnon as vice president, Charles L. Andrews as secretary and Campbell Carrington as treasurer.

The James S. Whitney was outbound from New York to Boston when she ran aground in Hell Gate channel at 5:40 p.m. on December 18, 1909. Captain J.W. Crowell found it necessary to give way for a passing Fall River Line package freighter, and while doing so was forced aground by the ebbing tide. It was necessary to lighter part of her cargo before she could be pulled off by tugs. No passengers were on board at the time.

Early on July 15, 1910, the James S. Whitney was again in trouble while bound from New York to Boston with a cargo of wool, cotton and oil. She passed Point Judith at 5:30 a.m. and caught fire about half an hour later. In an attempt to reach Vineyard Haven she ran onto the western end of Middle Ground Shoals in Vineyard Sound at 8 a.m. The steamer backed off the shoal at 11:45 a.m. and, accompanied by the revenue cutter Acushnet, safely reached Vineyard Haven. Contained in one section of the cargo hold, the fire continued to smolder for a couple days but was finally extinguished.

On the afternoon of the next day, July 16, 1910, fire destroyed Piers 14 and 15 on the North River in New York City. The H.F. Dimock of the Metropolitan Steamship Company and the Altemaha of the Brunswick Line were able to leave their berths with some damage, but two sailors from the H.F. Dimock panicked and were drowned. The Harvard suffered only some blistered paint and was able to sail on her evening departure for Boston from Pier 9.

Later in 1910 the Harvard and Yale were leased for $360,000 a year to the Pacific Navigation Company for service between San Francisco and Los Angeles. After a voyage by way of the Strait of Magellan to California, they entered service in December 1910. Sailings were extended to San Diego in 1911. Leased by H.F. Alexander's Admiral Line for service on the same route in 1916, they saw war service in 1918 as military ferries on the English Channel, a locale for which they were well suited. Later, they were operated on their old California coastwise route by the Los Angeles Steamship Company.

== Metropolitan Line ==
For the 1911 season the Massachusetts, Bunker Hill and Old Colony sailed between New York, Boston and Portland, Maine, for the Maine Steamship Company. In 1911 the Metropolitan Steamship Company and Maine Steamship Company were consolidated with the Eastern Steamship Company to form the Eastern Steamship Corporation. The Massachusetts and Bunker Hill were sent to the Cramp yard in 1912 for the addition of passenger accommodations and conversion to oil fuel. Their sister, the Old Colony, remained coal-fired.

The line went into receivership in 1914, but emerged in 1917 as Eastern Steamship Lines. The company's Boston-New York service, the Metropolitan Line, began using the Cape Cod Canal in 1916. During World War I the James S. Whitney and H.M. Whitney were sold to foreign interests, reportedly for $400,000 each, for ocean service. The H.F. Dimock and Herman Winter were also sold during this period and placed in the banana trade between Mobile, Alabama, and Bocas del Toro, Panama.

After the United States' entry into World War I, the Massachusetts and Bunker Hill were purchased by the United States Navy in 1917 and converted into minelayers as the USS Aroostook (CM-3) (later AK-44) and USS Shawmut (CM-4) (later USS Oglala (CM-4)).

Eastern assigned the steamers Camden, Belfast and North Land to the Metropolitan Line from 1918 to 1925. In 1924 the steamers Boston and New York were built for the service; they were joined at peak periods by the North Land. Sailings on the Metropolitan Line had always been summer-only, but Eastern assigned the steamers George Washington and Robert E. Lee to the route in the off season from 1927 to 1932. When the steamers Saint John and Acadia were built in 1932, Saint John was assigned to the Boston-Saint John, New Brunswick route in the summer, with the Acadia on a new route between New York and Yarmouth, Nova Scotia. In the off season both were assigned to the Metropolitan Line.

Service on Eastern's various routes was gradually reduced in the 1930s. The steamer New York left Manhattan on the last sailing of the Metropolitan Line on November 29, 1941.
