= Charles T. Barney =

American banker (1851–1907)

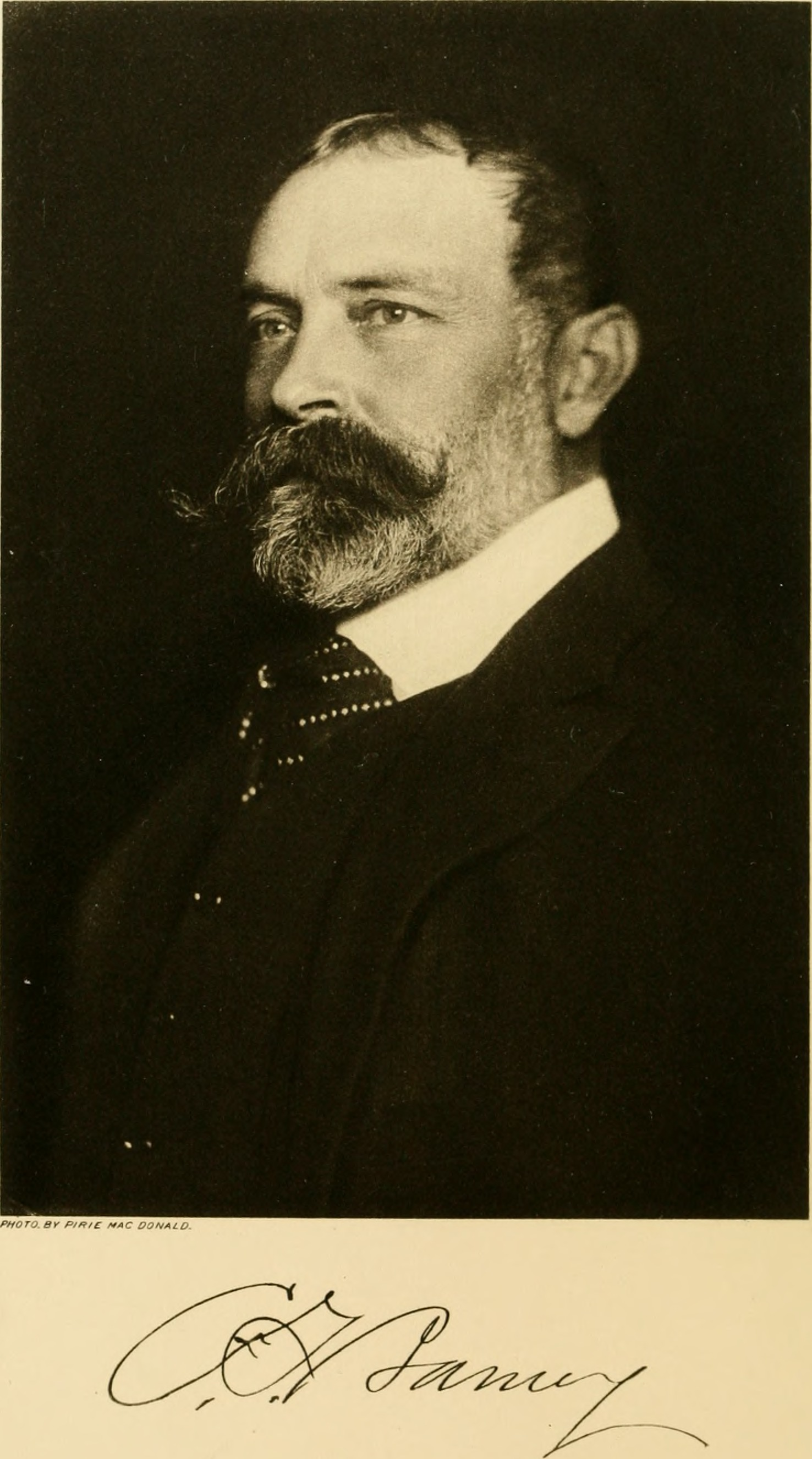
- Born: Charles Tracy Barney; January 27, 1851; Cleveland, Ohio
- Died: November 14, 1907 (aged 56); New York City, New York
- Cause of death: Suicide
- Spouse: Laurinda Collins Whitney
- Parent(s): Ashbel H. Barney; Susan Tracey Barney

Charles Tracy Barney (January 27, 1851 – November 14, 1907) was an American banker who was the president of the Knickerbocker Trust Company, the collapse of which shortly before Barney's death sparked the Panic of 1907.

== Early life ==
Charles T. Barney was born on January 27, 1851, in Cleveland, Ohio, the son of Ashbel H. Barney (1816–1886) and Susan (née Tracey) Barney. His father was a successful forwarding and commission merchant.

In 1857, the family moved to New York City, where his father was a director (1859–83), vice president (1867–69) and president (1869–70) of Wells Fargo & Company.

Barney attended Williams College in Williamstown, Massachusetts, where he was a member of Kappa Alpha Society, graduating in 1870. Following graduation he moved to New York and entered banking. With his mustache and beard and slightly thinning hair, Barney somewhat resembled his late, well-regarded father in appearance.

== Banking career ==
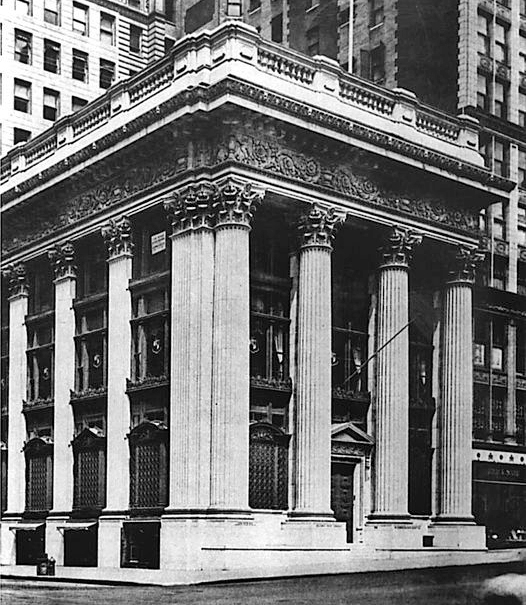
The headquarters of the Knickerbocker Trust Company in 1905, at the corner of 5th Avenue and 34th Street

His ties to the Whitney family helped him achieve great success in banking, real estate investment and opened the door to profitable business opportunities. Barney was made a special member of the firm of Rogers & Gould, members of the New York Stock Exchange. He joined the Knickerbocker Trust Company in 1884, was elected vice president in the 1890s and in 1897 succeeded Robert MacClay as president. During his tenure at Knickerbocker, the company's total deposits rose from $11 million to over $65 million. At its peak it was the third largest trust company in the city. In 1902-04 it built a new main office at the corner of Fifth Avenue and 34th Street (pictured), designed by McKim, Mead and White. There were also branch offices at 66 Broadway and in Harlem and The Bronx.

In his real estate operations, Barney joined William C. Whitney, Henry F. Dimock, W.E.D. Stokes, Francis W. Jenks, and others in forming the New York Loan and Improvement Company in 1890. This concern was responsible for the development of the Washington Heights section of New York City. He formed with George D. Sheldon and others in 1899 the so-called Barney-Sheldon real estate syndicate.

Besides serving as president and a director of the Knickerbocker Trust Company, Barney was president and a director of the New York Loan and Improvement Company; a trustee of the Bank for Savings; a director of the Brooklyn Life Insurance Company, Lawyers' Mortgage Insurance Company, United States Realty and Improvement Company, Title Insurance Company of New York, New York Mortgage and Security Company, Century Realty Company, Hudson Mortgage Company and Chelsea Realty Company; and a shareholder of the Santa Cecilia Sugar Company, Cuba Hardwood Company, Cuba Northeastern Railroad, American Ice Company, Ice Securities Company, Eastern Steamship Company, Metropolitan Steamship Company, Dominion Iron Company Ltd., Dominion Iron and Steel Company Ltd., and the Hudson Navigation Company (the Hudson River Night Line). He was also an investor in the New York City Subway and the Metropolitan Opera and Real Estate Company. Barney was also treasurer of the New York Zoological Society from 1901 to 1903.

=== Panic of 1907 ===
In 1907, the Knickerbocker entered into a deal organized by speculators F. Augustus Heinze and Charles W. Morse to corner the market of the United Copper Company. On Tuesday, October 15, 1907, their plan failed spectacularly when the share price of United Copper collapsed. Heinze's brokerage firm failed on October 17, and he was forced to resign as president of the Mercantile National Bank. On October 19 Morse was forced out of the banks with which he had been associated. Realizing that the Knickerbocker was involved in the failed cornering, depositors began to remove their deposits from the bank.

On October 21, Monday of the week after the bid collapsed, the board of the Knickerbocker Trust Company asked Barney to resign after he admitted involvement in the Morse speculations. That afternoon, the National Bank of Commerce announced it would no longer clear checks for the Knickerbocker. The next day, a massive bank run forced the Knickerbocker to suspend operations. George L. Rives, Henry C. Ide and Ernst Thalmann were named receivers. The failure of the Knickerbocker was the keystone of the Panic of 1907.

Barney's successor as president of Knickerbocker, A. Foster Higgins of Greenwich, Connecticut, was an unfortunate choice. He was 77 years old and quite garrulous. Foster made public statements, including one following the death of Barney, that greatly embarrassed the Rehabilitation Committee under F.G. Bourne and William A. Tucker that was trying to get the trust company on its feet again.

=== Suicide ===
Barney himself was not ruined financially. Despite his resignation he still had an estimated $2.5 million in assets over and above liabilities. But personally he was disgraced. On the morning of November 14, Barney was in his bedroom on the second floor of the house, with two windows facing 38th Street. He was accustomed to eating breakfast here and then conducting business by telephone before dressing in late morning. On this particular morning, Lily Barney and Mrs. Susan Abbott Mead, a guest who had arrived from Europe two weeks before, were in Lily's adjoining bedroom. Shortly before 10:00 a.m. they heard a shot fired in Barney's room. Mrs. Mead ran into the room and saw Mr. Barney standing. Mrs. Mead called to Lily Barney, who ran into the room. As she approached her husband, he fell to the floor and she cradled his head in her lap. Ashbel H. Barney II, who had heard the shot on the first floor, thereupon entered the room. Barney told his son, "Don't move me."

Barney had shot himself in the abdomen with a .32 caliber revolver. Lily Barney later told Coroner Harburger that pistols were kept on every floor of the house for protection. Medical assistance was summoned, and in the meantime Barney made and signed arrangements for the disposal of his affairs in addition to his existing will. Then, still in his home, he underwent exploratory surgery at the hands of Dr. Joseph A. Blake and the family's physician, Dr. George A. Dixon. Barney died at 2:30 p.m. while still under anesthesia.

Barney's funeral was conducted at the residence on November 16, 1907, by the Rev. Dr. Charles H. Parkhurst of the Madison Square Presbyterian Church. Some 40 persons were present for the private service, among them Barney's widow and their two daughters and one son (the other was in Europe). Also present were Harry Payne Whitney, Henry Melville Whitney, Joseph S. Auerbach, Dr. George A. Dixon and Barney's lawyers, George L. Nichols and Arthur H. Masten. Following the service, the hearse took Barney's body to Grand Central Station, from whence a special train took it to Woodlawn Cemetery. Parkhurst said a prayer at the graveside.

== Personal life ==
Barney married Laurinda Collins "Lily" Whitney, daughter of Brigadier General James Scollay Whitney and the former Laurinda Collins (a descendant of Plymouth governor William Bradford). She was the sister of William Collins Whitney, the patriarch of the Whitney family, industrialist Henry Melville Whitney, president of the Metropolitan Steamship Company, and Susan Collins Whitney, married attorney Henry F. Dimock. The Barneys were the parents of:

- Ashbel Hinman Barney II (1876–1945), who was in charge of the holdings of his family through the Barney Estate Company.
- James Whitney Barney (1878–1948)
- Gardiner Tracy Barney (1880–1887)
- Helen Tracy Barney (1882–1922), who married Archibald Stevens Alexander. After his death, she married Frederick N. Watriss.
- Katharine Lansing Barney (1885–1958), who married Courtlandt Dixon Barnes
- Marie Barney, who married Harry Newell Reynolds (d. 1917).

Barney and his family resided at 101 East 38th Street, corner of Park Avenue, in his father's old home. At the Metropolitan Opera he was the holder of box 9. A sportsman, he enjoyed hunting and pistol-shooting. He was chairman of the executive committee of the New York Zoological Society from 1904 until his death.

Of his sons, the elder, James W. Barney, was graduated from Yale University in 1900 and, an architect by profession, took up residence in Paris. The younger, Ashbel H. Barney II, joined the Wall Street firm of Rogers & Gould, in which Barney was still a special member.

William C. Whitney gave a debutante ball for Barney's daughter Helen at the Whitney mansion, 871 Fifth Avenue, on January 5, 1901.

Through his daughter Helen, Barney was the grandfather of Archibald S. Alexander (1906-1979), Under Secretary of the Army in the Truman Administration.
