= Henry F. Dimock =

American lawyer

Henry Farnam Dimock
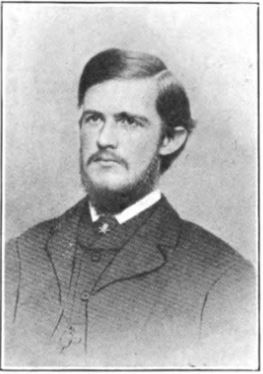
- Born: March 28, 1842; South Coventry, Connecticut
- Died: April 10, 1911 (aged 69); New York City
- Education: Yale University; Harvard Law School
- Board member of: Boston & Maine Railroad, Knickerbocker Trust Company, Metropolitan Steamship Company, Dominion Iron and Steel Company, Yale Corporation
- Spouse: Susan Collins Whitney
- Children: Susan M. Dimock
- Parent(s): Timothy Dimock; Laura F. Booth

Henry Farnam Dimock (March 28, 1842 – April 10, 1911) was an American lawyer in New York City who was closely associated with the Whitney family business interests.

== Early life and education ==
Dimock was born in South Coventry, Connecticut, the son of Dr. Timothy Dimock, MD and Laura F. (née Booth) Dimock. The family were descended from Thomas Dimock, who came from England to Dorchester, Massachusetts, in 1637, and later settled in Barnstable, Massachusetts. Henry Dimock was a distant cousin of Ira Dimock (1827-1917), silk manufacturer, and Dr. Susan Dimock MD (1847-1875), an early female physician who perished in the wreck of the SS Schiller in the Scilly Islands.

He was graduated from Yale University in 1863, where he was a member of Skull and Bones, and from Harvard Law School in 1865. In the latter year he commenced the practice of law in New York City.

== Career ==
From 1875 until 1881 he was dock commissioner for the Port of New York. In 1875, Governor Samuel J. Tilden appointed Dimock to a committee to devise plans for the improvement of city government in the state. It was in this capacity that he took part in a debate on municipal finance reform in October 1877. In May 1881, he declined reappointment as dock commissioner by Mayor William R. Grace.

Dimock became interested in the Metropolitan Steamship Company, serving as the line's New York agent. He was also a director and a large shareholder, and in 1884 the company honored him by naming its new 2,625-ton steamer H.F. Dimock.

In 1890, Dimock joined William C. Whitney, Charles T. Barney, W.E.D. Stokes, Francis W. Jenks, and others in forming the New York Loan and Improvement Company. He served on the board of directors of this concern, which was responsible for the development of the Washington Heights section of New York City.

On July 24, 1892, while on her customary voyage from New York to Boston, in the Vinyard Sound the H.F. Dimock collided with William K. Vanderbilt's yacht, the Alva, sinking her. Captain Morrison of the Alva filed suit against the H.F. Dimock, but both the United States District Court for Massachusetts and the United States Supreme Court ruled against Morrison.

In 1893, Dimock joined Henry Melville Whitney in establishing the Dominion Coal Company Ltd. and the Dominion Iron and Steel Company Ltd., in 1899, to exploit the mineral resources of the Sydney district of Cape Breton Island. Dimock served on the boards of both companies.

He was also a director of the McCall Ferry Power Company, Boston & Maine Railroad, Knickerbocker Trust Company, and the Metropolitan Steamship Company. Dimock was a member of the Society of Mayflower Descendants and of the University, Manhattan, Metropolitan, Down Town, Barnard, Lawyers, and Democratic clubs of New York City. He was also holder of box 19 at the Metropolitan Opera.

Dimock was elected a director of the Yale Corporation, the governing body of Yale University, in 1899 and reelected in 1905. His name had already been placed in nomination for another term when he suffered a heart attack on March 4, 1911.

== Personal life ==
He married Susan Collins Whitney, the daughter of James Scollay Whitney and Laurinda Collins. Her siblings included Henry Melville Whitney, industrialist; William Collins Whitney, financier and Secretary of the Navy: and Lucy Collins "Lily" Whitney, wife of banker Charles T. Barney. Dimock and Whitney resided in New York City at 25 60th Street, corner of Madison Avenue, and also had a summer home at Bar Harbor, Maine. Together, they had a daughter:

- Susan M. Dimock, who married Cary Talcott Hutchinson at the Dimock residence on April 30, 1901.

Dimock suffered a heart attack on March 4, 1911. He suffered a paralytic stroke that affected his right side on April 1. After two days in a coma, he died at his residence on April 10, 1911, at the age of 69.

Some five years after his death, the site of his home at Madison Avenue and 60th Street was leased to the Guaranty Trust Company for the construction of a new office building.

== See also ==
- Dominion Iron and Steel Company
- William Collins Whitney
