= William Collins Whitney =

American politician (1841–1904)

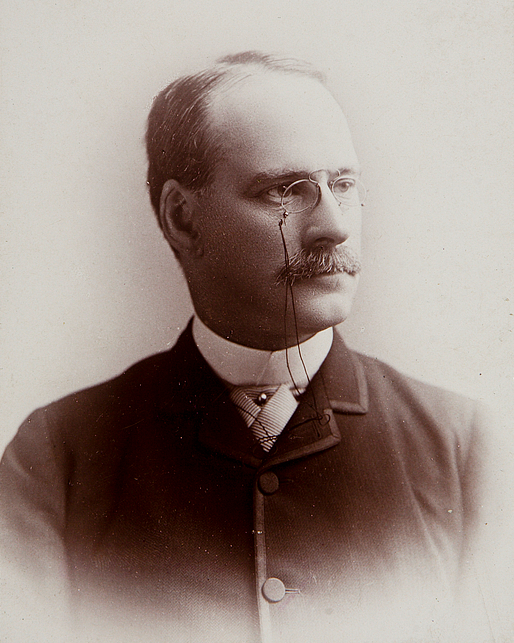

31st United States Secretary of the Navy
- In office March 7, 1885 – March 4, 1889
- President: Grover Cleveland
- Preceded by: William E. Chandler
- Succeeded by: Benjamin F. Tracy

Personal details
- Born: July 5, 1841 Conway, Massachusetts, U.S.
- Died: February 2, 1904 (aged 62) New York City, New York, U.S.
- Party: Democratic
- Spouses: Flora Payne (m. 1869; died 1893) Edith Randolph (m. 1896; died 1899)
- Children: 5, including Harry, Pauline, William, Dorothy
- Parent(s): James Scollay Whitney; Laurinda Collins Whitney
- Relatives: Henry Melville Whitney (brother)
- Education: Williston Seminary; Yale University (BA); Harvard University

William Collins Whitney (July 5, 1841 – February 2, 1904) was an American political leader and financier and a prominent member of the Whitney family. He served as Secretary of the Navy in the first administration of President Grover Cleveland from 1885 through 1889. A conservative reformer, he was considered a Bourbon Democrat.

== Early life and family ==
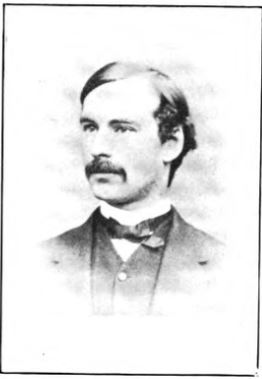
William Collins Whitney

William Whitney was born at Conway, Massachusetts, of Puritan stock. The family were descended from John Whitney of London, who settled at Watertown, Massachusetts, in 1635. William Whitney's father was Brigadier General James Scollay Whitney; his mother, Laurinda Collins, was a descendant of Plymouth governor William Bradford. Laurinda's paternal grandfather, Joseph Collins (1747–1826) was a great-grandson of Alice Bradford Adams (1659–1745) through her daughter, Alice Adams Collins (1682–1734). The older Alice was a daughter of William Bradford the Younger.

William Whitney had a well known older brother, industrialist Henry Melville Whitney (1839–1923), president of the Metropolitan Steamship Company, founder of the West End Street Railway Company of Boston, and later founder of the Dominion Coal Company and Dominion Iron and Steel Company in Sydney, Nova Scotia on Cape Breton Island. His sister Laurinda Collins "Lily" Whitney married Charles T. Barney, who became the president of the Knickerbocker Trust Company. Another sister, Susan Collins Whitney, married attorney Henry F. Dimock.

Educated at Williston Seminary, Easthampton, Massachusetts, Whitney graduated from Yale University in 1863, where he was a member of Skull and Bones, and then studied law at Harvard. He left in 1864 to study law with Abraham R. Lawrence in New York City, and in 1865 was admitted to the bar.

== Political career ==
Whitney was active in organizing the Young Men's Democratic Club in 1871. He was an aggressive opponent of the Tweed Ring, and was actively allied with the anti-Tammany County Democracy of 1871–1890. In 1872, he was made inspector of schools, but the same year met defeat in the election for district attorney.

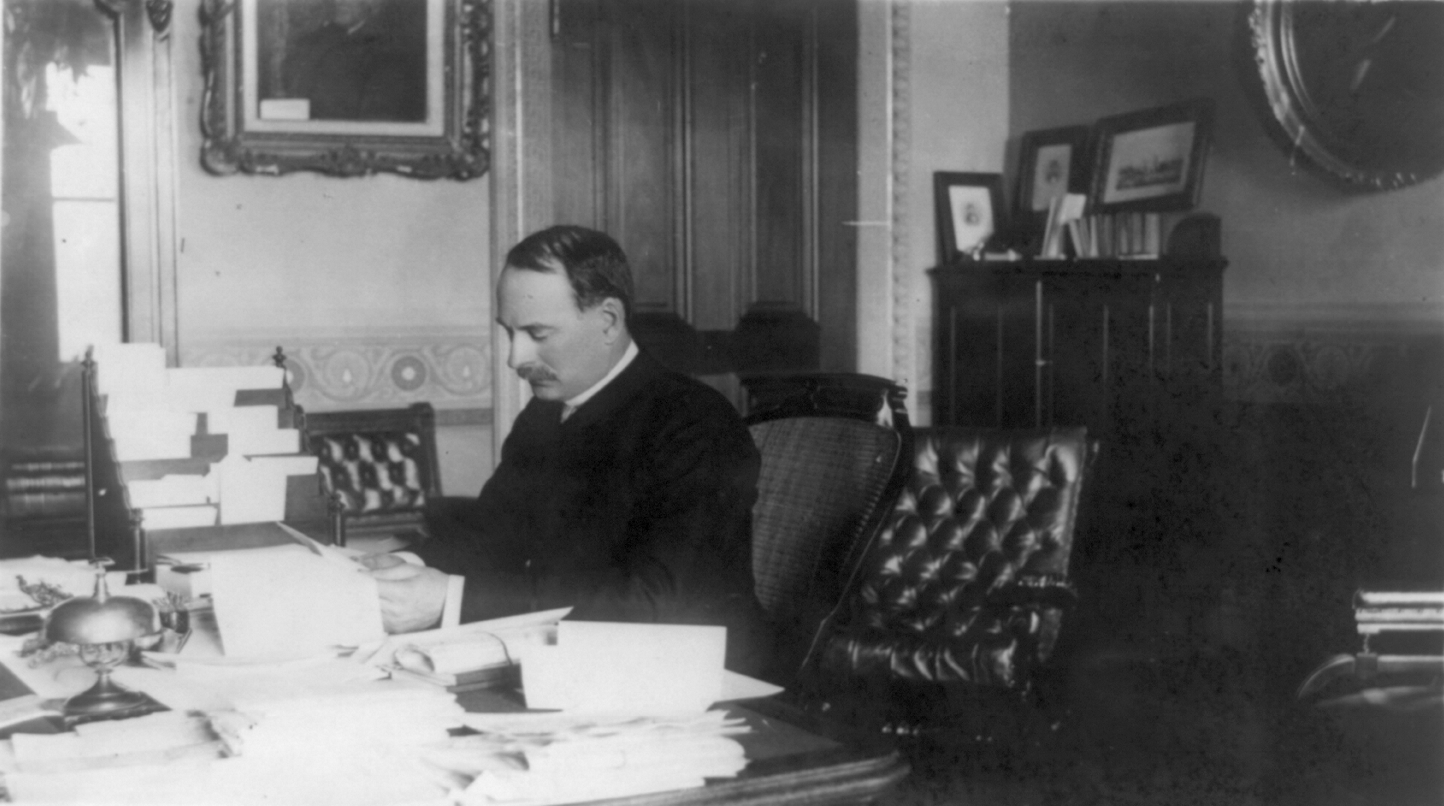
Secretary of the Navy William C. Whitney in his office (circa 1885)

From 1875 to 1882 he was Corporation counsel of New York City, and as such brought about a codification of the laws relating to the city, and successfully contested a large part of certain claims, largely fraudulent, against the city, amounting to about $20 million, and a heritage from the Boss Tweed regime. In 1882, he resigned to attend to personal interests.

In 1883, through the Broadway Railroad Company, Whitney became involved in a struggle with Jacob Sharp and Thomas Fortune Ryan for the Broadway street-railway franchise. Sharp initially won the franchise by means of bribery, but in December 1884 Ryan formed an alliance with Whitney and Peter A.B. Widener. By arousing public opinion, instituting court action, and prompting legislative investigation, they defeated Sharp. The Ryan syndicate finally received the franchise in 1886.

During President Cleveland's first administration (1885–1889), Whitney was United States Secretary of the Navy, and did much to develop the United States Navy. The contracts issued under the previous administration were investigated impartially by a committee appointed by Whitney and comprising Commander Robley D. Evans, Commodore George Belknap and Herman Winter, chief engineer of the Metropolitan Steamship Company. Whitney promoted the adoption by industry of the technology needed for the construction of steel steamships and modern naval guns and the domestic manufacture of plate armor. He also reorganized the finances and logistics of the Navy Department and helped make the Naval War College a success.

When Whitney left office in 1889, steel vessels completed or under construction included the armored cruiser (later battleship) Maine; monitors Puritan, Amphitrite, Monadnock, Terror and Miantonomoh; protected cruisers Atlanta, Boston, Chicago, Newark, Charleston, Baltimore, Philadelphia, and San Francisco; dynamite-gun cruiser Vesuvius; dispatch vessel Dolphin; gunboats Yorktown, Concord, Bennington and Petrel; and torpedo boat Cushing. These constituted the nucleus of the "New Navy" During Whitney's four years in the cabinet, his home in Washington, D.C., was a social center of great attraction. In 1888, Yale conferred upon him the honorary degree of LL.D.

Whitney joined Charles T. Barney, Henry F. Dimock, W.E.D. Stokes, Francis W. Jenks, and others in forming the New York Loan and Improvement Company in 1890. This concern developed the Washington Heights section of New York City. Barney was president of the company when he died in 1907, three years after Whitney. In opposition to Tammany, Whitney was instrumental in bringing about the third nomination of Cleveland in 1892, and took an influential part in the ensuing presidential campaign.

Whitney joined his brother Henry in organizing the Dominion Coal Company Ltd. in 1893, and the Dominion Iron and Steel Company Ltd. in 1899, to exploit the mineral resources of the Sydney district of Cape Breton Island. Other early investors included Henry F. Dimock, Almeric H. Paget and Charles T. Barney. In the next general election, in 1896, disapproving of the "free-silver" agitation, Whitney refused to support his party's candidate, William Jennings Bryan.

== Thoroughbred horse racing ==
William Whitney was also a major investor in thoroughbred horse racing, hiring the best trainers, buying the best horses, and engaging the services of the best jockey of the day. He established Westbury Stable with a string of thoroughbred race horses, competing against the successful stable of business associate James R. Keene. At his vast summer estate near Old Westbury on Long Island, Whitney built an 800-foot (240 m) stable with 84 box stalls and an adjoining mile-long training track. Around the start of the 20th century, in the United States his horses were trained by future U.S. Racing Hall of Fame inductee John W. Rogers and in England by John Huggins.

Whitney maintained a city residence in New York; a Venetian palace and 5,000 acres in Wheatley Hills, near Jamaica, New York; a Sheepshead Bay estate covering 300 acres with a house and private racetrack; a mansion with 700 acres at Lenox, Massachusetts; October Mountain summer cottage, a 10,000-acre estate including an 800-acre fenced-in game reserve, in Washington, Massachusetts; Kentucky Stock Farm, a Blue Grass farm of 3,000 acres; Stony Ford Farm, New York, used as an auxiliary to Kentucky Stock Farm; an Adirondack game preserve of 16,000 acres; and a lodge at Blue Mountain Lake, New York, with a fine golf course. Whitney also spent time in the equestrian community of Aiken, South Carolina, revamping a local cottage into a 69-room winter residence that included 15 bathrooms, a full-size ballroom, a squash court and a stable to house 30 horses. He had his own personal Pullman named Wanderer which made the Aiken trip tolerable. His involvement in Aiken along with that of Thomas Hitchcock, the Vanderbilt family, the Astor family and other equestrian minded business associates helped establish the premier Aiken Winter Colony. Aiken remains a haven where horses are brought in from the north to train and enjoy a more temperate winter.

He was the breeder of twenty-six American stakes winners, including the great filly Artful from his stallion Hamburg. On June 5, 1901, Whitney won England's Derby with Volodyovski, leased by him from Lady Valerie Meux. On October 24, 1903, The New York Times reported that W.C. Whitney had entered into a ten-year lease deal with Alexander John (A.J.) Alexander for one thousand acres (4 km^{2}) of the Wood Stud farm property at Spring Station, Kentucky.

In 1901 Whitney led a group of investors who bought the Saratoga Race Course, which had been in decline. Whitney made major improvements to the track and is widely credited with revitalizing racing at Saratoga.

== Personal life ==
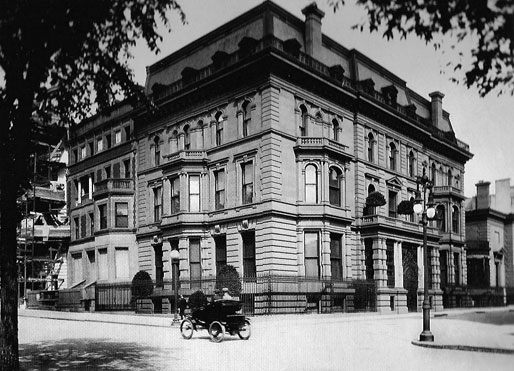
William C. Whitney House, 871 Fifth Avenue, New York City

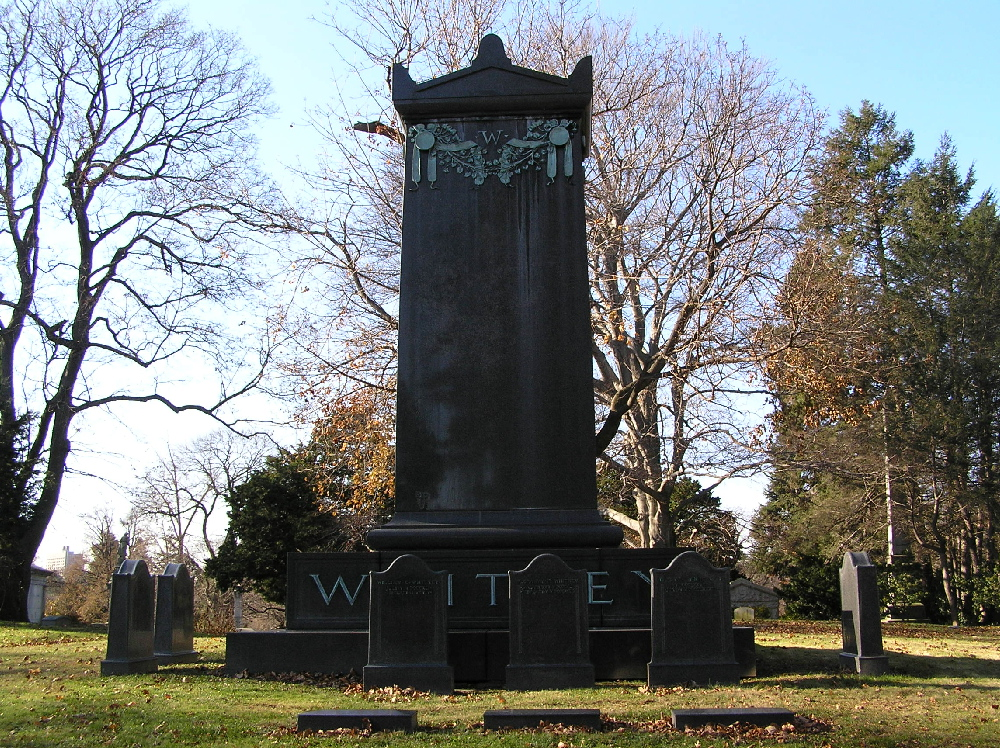
The monument of William Whitney in Woodlawn Cemetery

On October 13, 1869, he married Flora Payne, daughter of Senator Henry B. Payne of Ohio and sister of Whitney's Yale classmate, Colonel Oliver Hazard Payne, later treasurer of the Standard Oil Company. The Whitneys lived in the now-lost Stevens Mansion at 2 West 57th Street, where they commissioned Stanford White to renovate the interiors. They had five children:

- Harry Payne Whitney (1872–1930), who married Gertrude Vanderbilt (1875–1942)
- Pauline Payne Whitney (1874–1916), who married Almeric Hugh Paget, 1st Baron Queenborough (1861–1949)
- William Payne Whitney (1876–1927), who married Helen Julia Hay (1875–1944)
- Oliver Whitney (1878–1883), who died aged 5
- Dorothy Payne Whitney (1887–1968), who first married Willard Dickerman Straight (1880–1918) and later married Leonard Knight Elmhirst (1893–1974)

Flora Payne Whitney died on February 5, 1893, at age fifty-two. Two years later, in 1896, William Whitney remarried to widow Sibyl Randolph (née May). He gave his home at 2 West 57th Street to son Harry and his new bride Gertrude, and acquired for his new wife a residence at 871 Fifth Avenue at 68th Street in New York City, and commissioned McKim, Mead & White to do a $3.5 million renovation of the house. In 1898, Sibyl Whitney suffered a horse riding accident at their estate, Joye Cottage, in the Aiken Winter Colony (now known as Hitchcock Woods) in Aiken, South Carolina, and died at age forty-one on May 6, 1899.

Whitney was a member of Ward McAllister's "Four Hundred" as well as the Patriarch Society until its dissolution in April 1897. On January 5, 1901, at his residence at 871 Fifth Avenue, Whitney gave a debutante ball for his niece, Helen Barney.

He remained active in street-railway affairs until the reorganization of the Metropolitan Street Railway Company in 1902. At that time he retired from all personal identification with the company.

William Collins Whitney died on February 2, 1904, and was interred at Woodlawn Cemetery in The Bronx, New York. At the time of his death he was one of the largest landowners in the eastern United States, worth approximately $23 million (1/993rd of US GNP).

=== Honors ===
In his honor:

- The USS Whitney (AD-4) was named after him when launched on October 12, 1923, at the Boston Navy Yard
- The William C. Whitney Wilderness Area of the Adirondack Park in Upstate New York is also named in his honor.

Government offices
Preceded by William E. Chandler	United States Secretary of the Navy; 1885–1889	Succeeded by Benjamin F. Tracy
