= Joye Cottage =

Historic house in South Carolina, United States

- U.S. National Register of Historic Places
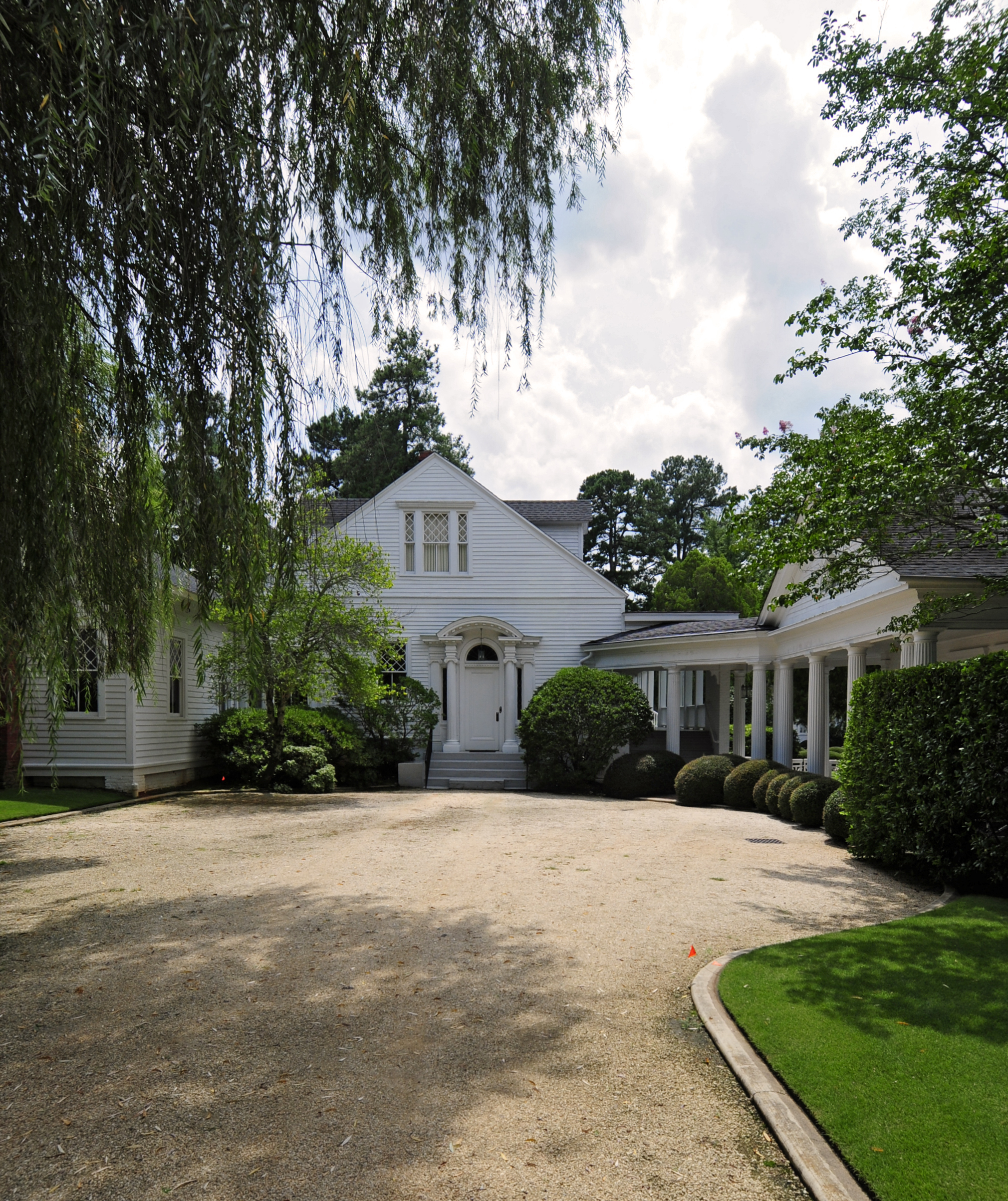

- Location within South Carolina Location within the United States
- Location: 463 Whiskey Rd. and 129 1st Ave., Aiken, South Carolina
- Coordinates: 33.55352°N 81.72379°W
- Area: 5.0 acres (2.0 ha)
- Built: 1897; 129 years ago
- Architect: George H. Freeman
- Architectural style: Prairie School, Georgian
- NRHP reference No.: 80003651
- Added to NRHP: September 29, 1980

Joye Cottage is one of the oldest, and largest winter retreats in Aiken, South Carolina. Most of the sprawling property dates to 1897, when William Collins Whitney purchased the property and remodeled it extensively. It now includes a main house, a stable, a greenhouse, a laundry house, a couple of one-story cottages, and a squash court. The property was listed on the National Register of Historic Places in 1980.
