= James Scollay Whitney =

American politician (1811–1878)

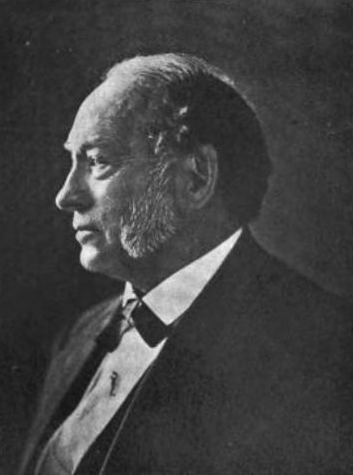
- Born: May 19, 1811; South Deerfield, Massachusetts, U.S.
- Died: October 24, 1878 (aged 67); Boston, Massachusetts, U.S.
- Employer: Metropolitan Steamship Company
- Spouse: Laurinda Collins
- Children: Henry Melville Whitney; William Collins Whitney; Susan Collins Whitney; Lily Collins Whitney
- Relatives: Henry L. Dawes (cousin)

Signature
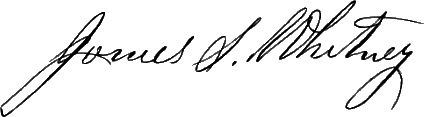

James Scollay Whitney (May 19, 1811 – October 24, 1878) was an American business executive and politician. He was the father of Henry Melville Whitney and William Collins Whitney who became successful entrepreneurs in their own right.

== Early life ==
Whitney was born on May 19, 1811, in the part of South Deerfield, Massachusetts that was then known as "Bloody Brook". He was the son of Stephen Whitney (1784–1852), a merchant and manufacturer, and his second wife, Mary (née Burgess) Whitney (1786–1868), the daughter of Dr. Benjamin Burgess. Among his siblings were Susan Whitney (wife of James I. Wakefield) and Mary Ann Whitney (wife of Theodore Billings). From his father's first marriage to Persis Locke, he was the younger half-brother of Stephen Whitney.

Through his maternal aunt, Mercy (née Burgess) Dawes, he was a first cousin of Republican Senator and Representative Henry L. Dawes. The Whitney family were descended from John Whitney (1590–1673) of London who settled in 1635 at Watertown, Massachusetts.

== Career ==
In 1835, when he was only 24, Whitney was elected and commissioned brigadier general of the 2nd Brigade of the Massachusetts State Militia, which he was largely influential in reorganizing. Upon succeeding to the management of his father's manufacturing business in 1838, he moved it to Conway, Massachusetts, where he became a large manufacturer.

A Jacksonian Democrat, Whitney was town clerk of Conway from 1843 to 1852. He represented Conway in the legislature of 1851 and, in the same year, he was appointed sheriff of Franklin County. In 1853, he was elected to the convention for the revision of the state constitution, in which he was prominent in the deliberations of the delegates. Whitney again represented Conway in the legislature of 1854.

In 1854, Whitney was appointed superintendent of the federal armory at Springfield, Massachusetts, by President Franklin Pierce, holding the position until 1860. He was a delegate to the Democratic National Convention of 1856 in Cincinnati, which nominated James Buchanan, and also that of 1860 in Charleston, which was wracked by sectional dissension before finally nominating Stephen A. Douglas. When Whitney left the Springfield Armory in 1860, President Buchanan appointed him Collector of Customs for the Port of Boston. He was removed, however, by the incoming Republican administration of Abraham Lincoln in 1861.

Whitney then went into business in Boston. In February 1866, he joined Boston interests in organizing the Metropolitan Steamship Company, of which he was elected president. His son Henry was named its agent at Boston. The company operated steamships between Boston and New York City on the "outside line" around Cape Cod. The line named the iron steamer SS General Whitney in his honor in 1873.

A member of the Massachusetts State Senate from the 1st Norfolk District in 1872, Whitney was president of the Democratic State Convention of 1876, which nominated Charles Francis Adams, Sr. for governor, and also that of 1878, which nominated Josiah G. Abbott for governor.

== Personal life ==
On November 23, 1836, Whitney married Laurinda Collins (1810–1908) in Somers, Connecticut. Laurinda, a daughter of William Collins and Eunice (née) Collins, was a descendant of William Bradford, the Governor of Plymouth Colony. The Whitneys were the parents of two sons and four daughters, of whom the following received historical mention:

- Henry Melville Whitney (1839–1923), who married Margaret Foster Green, daughter of Admiral Joseph F. Green.
- William Collins Whitney (1841–1904), who first married Flora Payne, daughter of Senator Henry B. Payne of Ohio. After her death, he married Edith (née May) Randolph.
- Susan Collins Whitney (1845–1939), who married lawyer Henry F. Dimock (1842–1911), son of Timothy Dimock.
- Lorinda Collins "Lily" Whitney (1852–1946), who married Charles T. Barney (1851–1907), president of the Knickerbocker Trust Company.

Whitney died in Boston on October 24, 1878. He was succeeded as president of the Metropolitan Steamship Company by his son, Henry M. Whitney.

== See also ==
- 1872 Massachusetts legislature
- Whitney family
