= Henry Melville Whitney =

American industrialist (1839–1923)

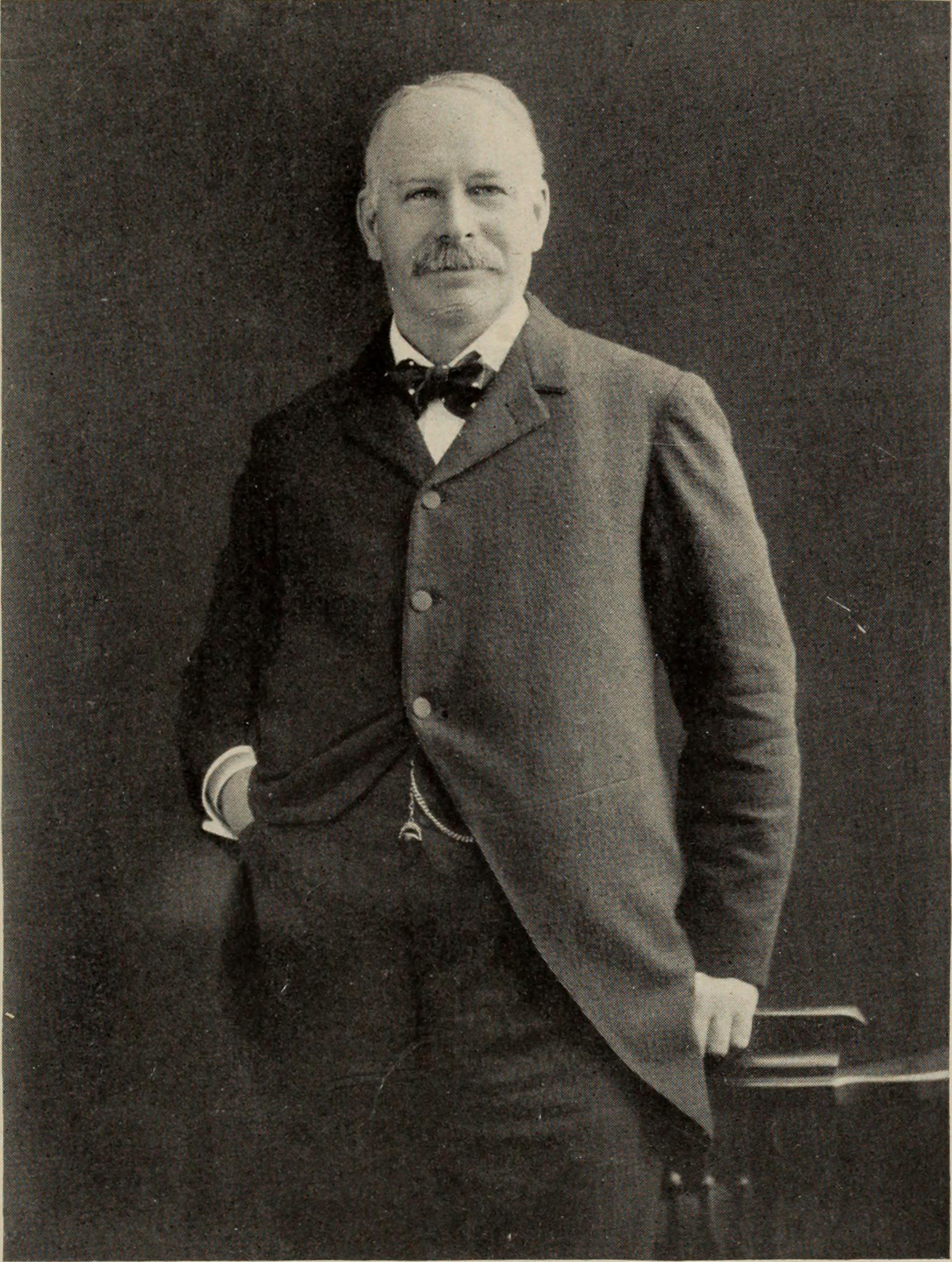
- Whitney c. 1900
- Born: October 22, 1839; Conway, Massachusetts, U.S.
- Died: January 25, 1923 (aged 83); Brookline, Massachusetts, U.S.
- Education: Williston Seminary
- Occupation: Industrialist
- Organization: Metropolitan Steamship Company
- Known for: Founder of the West End Street Railway Company and Dominion Iron and Steel Company
- Spouse: Margaret F. Green
- Children: 5
- Parent(s): James Scollay Whitney; Laurinda Collins
- Relatives: William Collins Whitney (brother); Charles T. Barney (brother-in-law); Henry F. Dimock (brother-in-law)

Signature
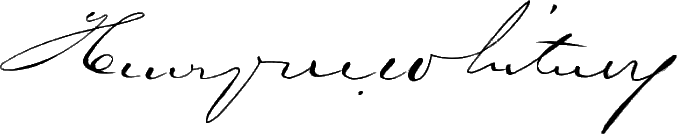

Henry Melville Whitney (October 22, 1839 – January 25, 1923) was an American industrialist, the founder of the West End Street Railway Company of Boston, Massachusetts, and later the Dominion Coal Company Ltd. and the Dominion Iron and Steel Company Ltd. of Sydney, Nova Scotia. He was also president of the Metropolitan Steamship Company, long an important transportation link between Boston and New York City.

== Early life ==
Whitney was born on October 22, 1839, in Conway, Massachusetts to Brigadier General James Scollay Whitney (1811–1878) and Laurinda Collins. Henry's well known younger brother was the financier William Collins Whitney (1841–1904), who served as Secretary of the Navy in the first administration (1885–1889) of President Grover Cleveland. His sister Lucy Collins "Lily" Whitney married Charles T. Barney, who became the president of the Knickerbocker Trust Company. Another sister, Susan Collins Whitney, married Henry F. Dimock.

Whitney was educated at Williston Seminary in East Hampton, Massachusetts. Whitney was said to have been a personally pleasant and genial man who had hearing difficulties from childhood.

=== Family ===
His family was descended from Puritans including John Whitney of London, who settled in 1635 at Watertown, Massachusetts. Through his mother, he was a descendant of William Bradford (c.1590–1657), the 2nd, 5th, 7th, 9th & 12th Governor of Plymouth Colony and signer of the Mayflower Compact.

== Career ==
He began his business career as a clerk in a bank in Conway in 1856. In 1859, he went to Boston, where he was a clerk in the Bank of Mutual Redemption. He then worked as a clerk in the office of the navy agent at the Boston Custom House in 1860–1861. Upon the outbreak of the American Civil War in 1861, Whitney went to New York City and engaged in the shipping business.

In 1866, Whitney returned to Boston and was appointed agent of the Metropolitan Steamship Company, of which his father was president. This concern operated steamships on the "outside line" between Boston and New York around Cape Cod.

=== Metropolitan Steamship Company ===
Upon his father's death on October 24, 1878, Whitney was elected his successor as president of the Metropolitan Steamship Company, retaining the position of agent at Boston.

In June 1890 the Metropolitan Steamship Company placed the new iron steamer H.M. Whitney in service between Boston and New York. The 2,706-ton, 288-foot (88 m) vessel was built by William Cramp & Sons at Philadelphia. H.M. Whitney was flagship of the Metropolitan fleet until she was run down and sunk by the steamer Ottoman in Boston harbor on September 28, 1892. There were no deaths, and H.M. Whitney was later refloated and, after reconditioning, returned to service. It had another collision in 1898, with the schooner Ira D. Sturgis, and again on November 5, 1908, when she attempted to avoid a collision with a tugboat and four barges off Hallett's Point and ran aground on the east end of Ward's Island and sank. In both instances, the ship was repaired and continued on its journey.

In 1906, Charles W. Morse acquired control of the Company, placing it under the control of the Consolidated Steamship Company in January 1907. Morse crashed in the Panic of 1907, however. In 1911, the Metropolitan Steamship Company and the Maine Steamship Company (a New York City-Portland, Maine, operator) merged with the Eastern Steamship Company to form the Eastern Steamship Corporation. The line went into receivership in 1914, but emerged in 1917 as Eastern Steamship Lines. Service on Eastern's Metropolitan Line was maintained until 1941.

Whitney retired from the board of the Metropolitan Steamship Company in 1909.

=== West End Street Railway Company ===
In 1886, Whitney established the West End Street Railway Company, with himself as president, as a combination of the five street railways of the Boston area. By the next year it had consolidated ownership of a number of horse-drawn streetcar lines, composing a fleet of 7,816 horses and 1,480 rail vehicles. As the system grew, Whitney chose to deploy electric propulsion systems after visiting Frank Sprague and witnessing the Richmond, Virginia system in action. A section of track was used to test the Bentley-Knight underground power line, but it was abandoned because of failures and safety concerns (especially after the electrocution of a team of horses in 1889). After competing in operational tests with the Sprague streetcar system, the Thomson-Houston company was chosen for system-wide deployment of overhead wires.

=== Whitney coal syndicate ===
In 1889, Whitney and Frederick Stark Pearson, chief engineer of the West End Street Railway Company, formed the Whitney coal syndicate with Benjamin Franklin Pearson of the People's Heat and Light Company of Halifax, Nova Scotia. The group purchased one coal mine and obtained options on others south of Sydney in eastern Cape Breton Island. Premier William Stevens Fielding and the Liberal provincial administration favored Whitney's entry into the coal business because his steamships and street-railway electric generators consumed large quantities of coal. The Whitney syndicate was offered an unprecedented 99-year lease at a fixed royalty; the group exercised its options, acquiring most of the existing bituminous coal mines of eastern Cape Breton Island and co-opting such local figures as John Stewart McLennan and David MacKeen. This process took some months, and Whitney was not ready to consolidate operations at Sydney until early 1893. People's Heat and Light after it was incorporated in 1893, with Whitney as president, and B.F. Pearson as secretary.

=== Dominion Coal Company ===
On February 1, 1893, the Dominion Coal Company Ltd. (DOMCO) was incorporated with Whitney as president, B.F. Pearson as secretary and F.S. Pearson as chief engineer. Early investors in this enterprise included Whitney's younger brother, William C. Whitney; his brothers-in-law, Henry F. Dimock and Charles T. Barney; and Almeric H. Paget, who later married William's daughter Pauline.

The new company quickly effected numerous efficiencies and improvements, and production was quadrupled within a decade. There were, however, costly mistakes, prominent among them the tendency to become locked into low-price contracts (such as to Whitney's companies), thus missing a large market at higher prices. By 1901, some 90 per cent of its output was committed to such low-price contracts. The company made a large public offering of stock, which tumbled in price when Whitney failed to get the American import duty on coal removed or at least reduced.

Whitney expanded operations at Sydney with the organization in March 1899 of the Dominion Iron and Steel Company Ltd. (DISCO), which had financial backing in both Canada and the United States. Whitney was joined in the new enterprise by his long-time business friends - F.S. Pearson, B.F. Pearson, W.C. Whitney, C.T. Barney, H.F. Dimock, A.H. Paget and J.S. McLennan. The promise of federal bounties, together with concessions from the Liberal provincial administration of Premier George Henry Murray, enabled DISCO to begin work in June 1899 on the largest integrated steel mill in the British Empire. Located on the south side of Sydney Harbour, which Whitney said offered more advantages than anywhere else in the world, the mill was completed in 1901. Iron ore was mined by DISCO on Bell Island in Newfoundland and shipped to Sydney.

Competitors in Britain, France, Germany and the United States were initially concerned. However, continuing problems of management and cost control led to Whitney's early withdrawal from the project. Later in 1901, Whitney and his associates sold majority control of DOMCO to James Ross of Montreal, and their minority share of DISCO to Ross and several other Canadian interests. Whitney resigned as president of DISCO in 1902, and as a member of the DOMCO board in December 1903. Also in 1903, James H. Plummer of Toronto gained control of DISCO, and later DOMCO in 1910, placing them under the Dominion Steel Corporation in 1910. Although Whitney remained on the DISCO board until 1909, his focus was redirected to New England.

=== Other companies ===
Back in Boston, Whitney established the New England Gas and Coke Company for the purpose of manufacturing and distributing illuminating gas and railroad-grade coke. In January 1896, Whitney announced the organization of the Massachusetts Pipe Line Gas Company. The new concern would purchase gas from New England Gas and Coke, which in turn purchased its raw material from DOMCO. A new contract between DOMCO and New England Gas and Coke was signed on September 30, 1897, and by mid-1899, a new gas plant was in operation in Everett, Massachusetts. The arrangement led to the unfortunate public perception that the contract had been intended to enhance the value of the companies' stock.

In June 1917, New England Fuel And Transportation, of which J.L. Richards was CEO, took over the assets and liabilities of The New England Gas and Coke Co. as well as Boston Tow Boat Co., Federal Coal and Coke Co., and the New England Coal and Coke Co.

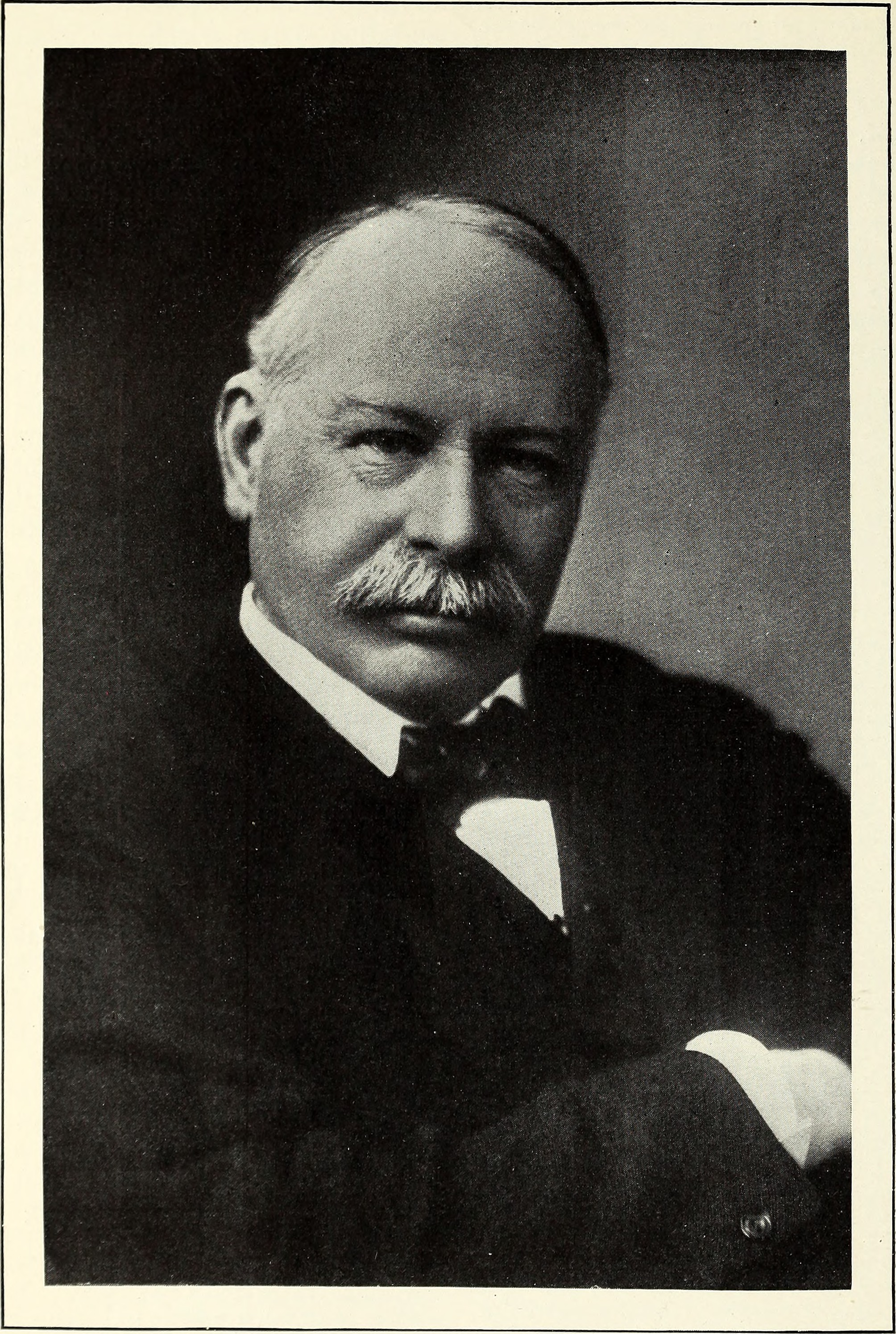
Whitney, c. 1907

== Politics ==
In 1904, Whitney was elected president of the Boston Chamber of Commerce. He also became interested in politics, promoting tariff reform and reciprocal trade agreements between Canada and the United States.

In 1905, Whitney ran for Lieutenant Governor of Massachusetts as a Democrat, losing by 1,996 votes to Republican Eben S. Draper, which prompted a recount. Draper succeeded and became the 40th Lt. Governor of Massachusetts, serving under Curtis Guild Jr., the previous Lt. Governor. In November 1905, Whitney had a public battle with President Theodore Roosevelt over duty reciprocity with Canada.

In 1907, two years later, Whitney was the Democratic candidate for Governor of Massachusetts in the general election of November 5, 1907. His candidacy caused Grenville MacFarland, the Chairman of the Executive Committee of the Democratic State Committee of Massachusetts to resign his post and his membership in the State Committee because of Whitney's Democratic nomination for Governor. MacFarland felt that Whitney represented corporate interests over "true Democratic principles" in his support of the merger of New York, New Haven and Hartford with Boston and Maine railroads. Whitney eventually failed in his bid to unseat the Republican incumbent, Curtis Guild Jr. Eleven days later, he represented the family, along with Harry Payne Whitney, at the funeral in New York City of his brother-in-law, Charles T. Barney, who had shot himself following the failure of the Knickerbocker Trust Company in the Panic of 1907.

In 1911, Whitney endorsed Senator Henry Cabot Lodge for reelection to the United States Senate in Massachusetts, due to Lodge's interest in tariff reforms, even though Lodge was a Republican. He supported Lodge over Governor elect Eugene Foss's, a fellow Democrat, opposition to Lodge.

== Personal life ==
On October 3, 1878, Whitney married Margaret Foster Green (1856–1932) of Brookline, Massachusetts, daughter of Admiral Joseph F. Green. Residing in Brookline, the couple were the parents of one son and four daughters.

- Ruth Whitney
- Eleanor Whitney, who married J. P. Gardner
- Laura Whitney
- James S. Whitney, who attended Harvard with the class of 1908.
- Josephine Whitney (b. 1891), who married Frank Boott Duveneck (1886–1985), the only child of painters Frank Duveneck and Elizabeth Boott.

Whitney lived in Brookline, where he died on January 25, 1923, at the age of 84. Largely because of the easy success of his younger brother, Whitney was generally supposed to be wealthy, but he had suffered losses from poor investments over a period of years. When the estate of "the supposed multi-millionaire", as The New York Times put it, was probated, it was found to be worth only $1,221.

Party political offices
Preceded by John Crawford Crosby	Democratic nominee for Lieutenant Governor of Massachusetts; 1905	Succeeded by E. Gerry Brown
Preceded by John B. Moran	Democratic nominee for Governor of Massachusetts; 1907	Succeeded by James H. Vahey
