= Oliver Hazard Payne =

American businessman and brigadier general (1839–1917)

Oliver H. Payne
- Born: July 21, 1839; Cleveland, Ohio, U.S.
- Died: June 27, 1917 (aged 77); New York City, New York, U.S.
- Resting place: Lake View Cemetery
- Education: Phillips Academy
- Alma mater: Yale University
- Occupation: Businessman
- Parent(s): Henry B. Payne; Mary Perry
- Relatives: William Payne Whitney (nephew); Harry Payne Whitney (nephew); Frances Payne Bolton (niece)

Oliver Hazard Payne (July 21, 1839 – June 27, 1917) was an American businessman, organizer of the American Tobacco Company Trust, assisted with the formation of U.S. Steel, and was affiliated with Standard Oil.

== Early life ==
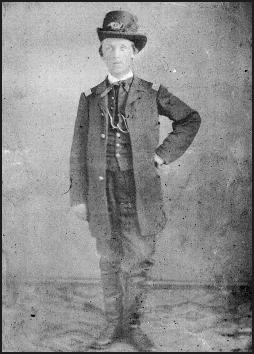
Payne in Union Army uniform.

Oliver Hazard Payne was born on July 21, 1839, in Cleveland, Ohio. He was the son of Henry B. Payne, a businessman, U.S. Representative and U.S. Senator, and Mary (née Perry) Payne, who was a member of the Perry family. He was named for Oliver Hazard Perry. He was the uncle of William Payne Whitney and Harry Payne Whitney. He was also the uncle of Congresswoman Frances Payne Bolton.

Payne was educated at the Phillips Academy in Andover, Massachusetts, where he graduated in 1859. He attended Yale College, where he was a member of Delta Kappa Epsilon.

== Career ==
In 1861, at the outbreak of the American Civil War of 1861–1865, Payne enlisted in the Union Army. By 1863, he was colonel of the 124th Ohio Infantry. He was Brevetted Brigadier General March 13, 1865.

Payne began his career shortly after the war, investing in iron and then oil refining. His oil interests were the first acquired by Standard Oil, and he became a trustee of that firm. He was charged with bribing members of the Ohio Legislature to attain a Senate seat for his father (before the U.S. Senate was directly elected), and with bribing the Democratic Party to name his brother-in-law United States Secretary of the Navy, though the charges were dropped.

== Personal life ==
Payne was a yachtsman. He chartered the steam yacht Eleanor in 1897 and liked her so well that he contracted with her builder, Bath Iron Works, to build an even larger yacht along the same lines. Payne's steam yacht Aphrodite was the largest yacht ever built in the United States when she was launched in 1898. Aphrodite was one of the finest yachts of the time with Payne making a round the world cruise aboard and took the yacht to Europe every summer from 1908 until outbreak of war in 1914 limited his cruises to American waters.

Payne died at his home, 852 Fifth Avenue in New York City, on June 27, 1917. He was buried at Lake View Cemetery in Cleveland, Ohio. His estate was valued at in excess of $32,000,000.

His estate at the hamlet of West Park, New York, known as the Col. Oliver Hazard Payne Estate, was listed on the National Register of Historic Places in 2002 and is now the home of Marist College's Raymond A. Rich Institute for Leadership Development.
