= Washington Heights-Inwood War Memorial =

Monument in Manhattan, New York

Coordinates: 40.840412°N 73.939894°W

The Washington Heights-Inwood War Memorial, also known as the Inwood Monument, is a World War I (WWI) monument sculpted by Gertrude Vanderbilt Whitney, with a base by Albert Randolph Ross. It is located at the intersection of Broadway and St. Nicholas Avenue between 167th and 168th Streets in Mitchel Square Park, Manhattan, New York City.

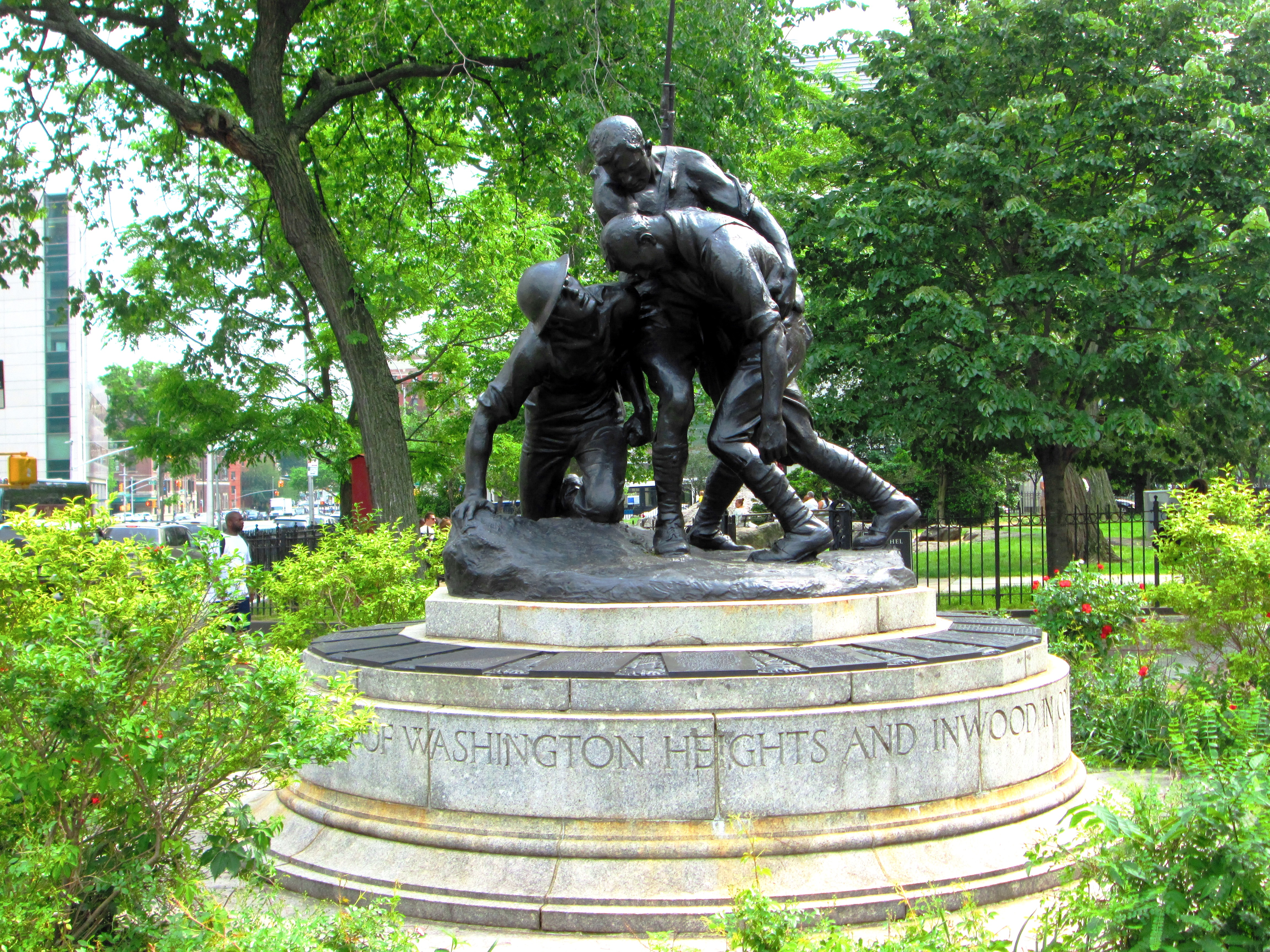
Mitchel Square World War I memorial

== Context ==
The Inwood Monument was dedicated on Memorial Day, May 30, 1922. It honors men "from the adjacent communities in northern Manhattan of Washington Heights and Inwood" who fought and died during WWI. The monument commemorates servicemen from three distinct branches of the military: the Navy, the Army, and the Marine Corps.

=== Gertrude Vanderbilt Whitney ===
The monument’s sculptor, Gertrude Vanderbilt Whitney, traveled to France during WWI to start a hospital in Juilly and dedicate her time to aiding the injured. Unlike other war memorials, her figures depict the realities of war, illustrating the experiences of average servicemen at war. Whitney portrayed these men realistically, deriving inspiration from her original sketches while in France, as seen in her memorial sculptures, including the Inwood Monument and Victory Arch. Whitney spent her life as both an arts patron and an artist, although for the majority of her time she only received recognition for her patronage. The lack of commendation for her artistic achievements resulted largely from gender stereotypes and the impact of her immense wealth on others’ views of her persona. The interplay of Whitney’s two roles spurred her entrance into sculpting public monuments, such as the Inwood Monument, which depict themes from WWI and Whitney’s own wartime experiences. The monuments gave her a socially-accepted venue for self-expression.

== Design ==
The Inwood Monument’s three-figure sculpture originated from a wartime sketch, and began as a clay sculpture of two figures. The third figure was added later in Whitney's design process, comprising her final product. Whitney initially created an interplay of two figures, a sculpture entitled His Bunkie, which was modeled between 1916 and 1919 and cast in bronze upon its completion in 1919. It represents a standing and a kneeling serviceman. After Whitney’s commission for the monument, she added a third figure to His Bunkie which kneels beneath the original two, as they support their third, fallen companion. She also created a smaller scale version of the Inwood monument, fashioned between 1921 and 1922, and cast in bronze in 1922; Whitney used this version as a model for the final structure displaying the soldier, the sailor, and the marine. The inscription on the granite pedestal of the monument reads, “Erected by the people of Washington Heights and Inwood in commemoration of the men who gave their lives in the World War”. There are 20 star-shaped plaques made of bronze and set into a “two-colored flagstone paving,” surrounding the monument and its base. The plaques symbolize fatalities of 357 men local to the Manhattan area surrounding Mitchel Square Park. An overarching theme expressed by the Inwood Monument is the honoring of the common soldier in wounded condition, which differentiates Whitney's monument from war memorials which glorify war or well-known generals.

== Construction ==
The sculpture of the three servicemen was first modeled between 1921 and 1922, and later cast in bronze by the Roman Bronze Company of Greenpoint in 1922. The figures are supported by a plinth on an octagonal base made of white marble, topped by a circular, Deer Isle granite pedestal with twenty plaques, all of which were constructed by Alfred Randolph Ross of the firm Delano and Aldrich. The Inwood Monument was commissioned as a public monument by the Washington Heights and Inwood Memorial Association. Whitney was commissioned to sculpt the monument, and her contract was drafted in July 1921. It took a total of ten months for her to finalize the monument, and it was completed May 26, 1922, only days before its dedication on Memorial Day of the same year.

== Dedication ==
The Inwood Monument’s dedication ceremony took place on May 30, 1922, Memorial Day, to coincide with “the parades and military demonstrations throughout the five boroughs”. Several citizens and war veterans, along with Colonel William Hayward, marched through Mitchel Square Park, leading up to the dedication service. They, along with Mayor Hylan of New York, members of both the Washington Heights and Inwood Memorial Association and the Veterans of Foreign Wars, and various clergymen and politicians were in attendance at the ceremony. The dedication also notably occurred on the same day that Mitchel Square Park was given in honor of Mayor John Purroy Mitchel, who died during air service training for the Army Aviation Corps of WWI.

== Restoration and conservation ==
The Inwood Monument was fully restored in 1998 through a conservation effort funded by citizen contributions and a grant from the U.S. World War I Centennial Commission. A significant contributor to the funding was former New York City Council Member Guillermo Linares. The endeavor was spearheaded by Rudolph L. Leibel, a professor at Columbia University and veteran of the U.S. Army Medical Corps, who felt a personal connection to the monument after years of passing by it every day. The New York City Parks Department assembled a team which accomplished various repairs, including a replica of the vandalized bayonet from the Army soldier’s rifle, cast by the Bedi-Makky Art Foundry in Brooklyn. The bayonet was stolen upwards of two times, sparking Leibel’s motivation to launch a conservation undertaking. Beyond the bayonet replica, this conservation included repointing of the stone masonry and application of protective wax coating to all bronze elements of the monument. Most recently, a ceremony was held in the park on November 7, 2018, to commemorate both the restoration of the monument and the centennial of the end of WWI, at which Professor Leibel gave a speech.
