= American Expeditionary Forces Memorial =

War memorial in Saint-Nazaire, France

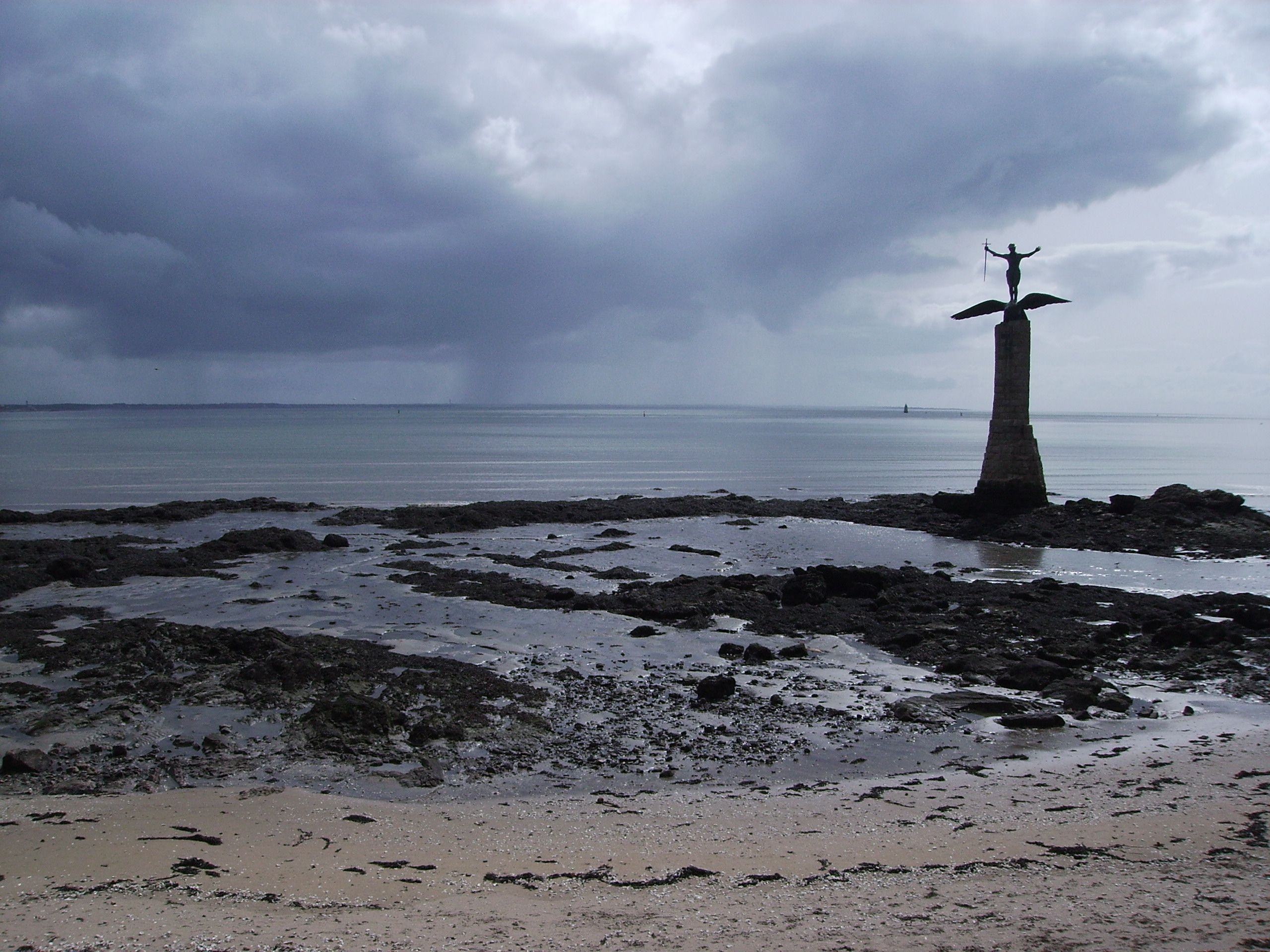
The memorial reinstalled, in 2006

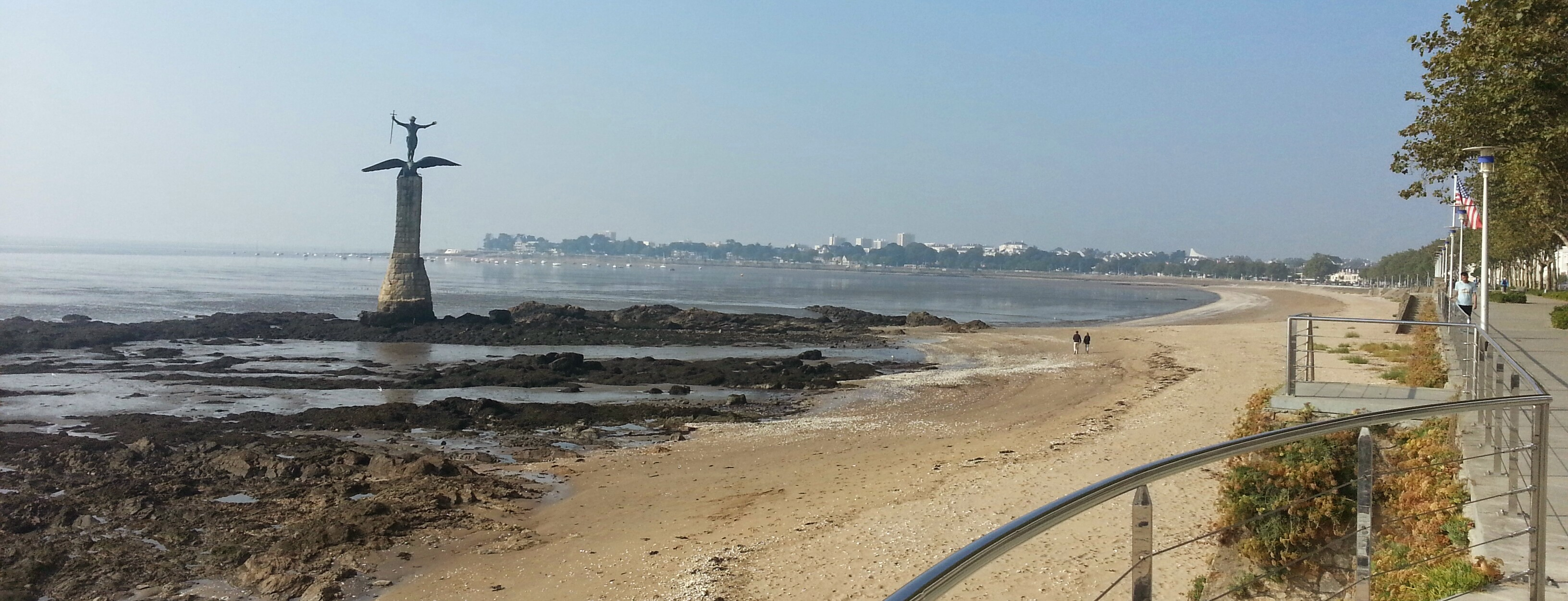
20

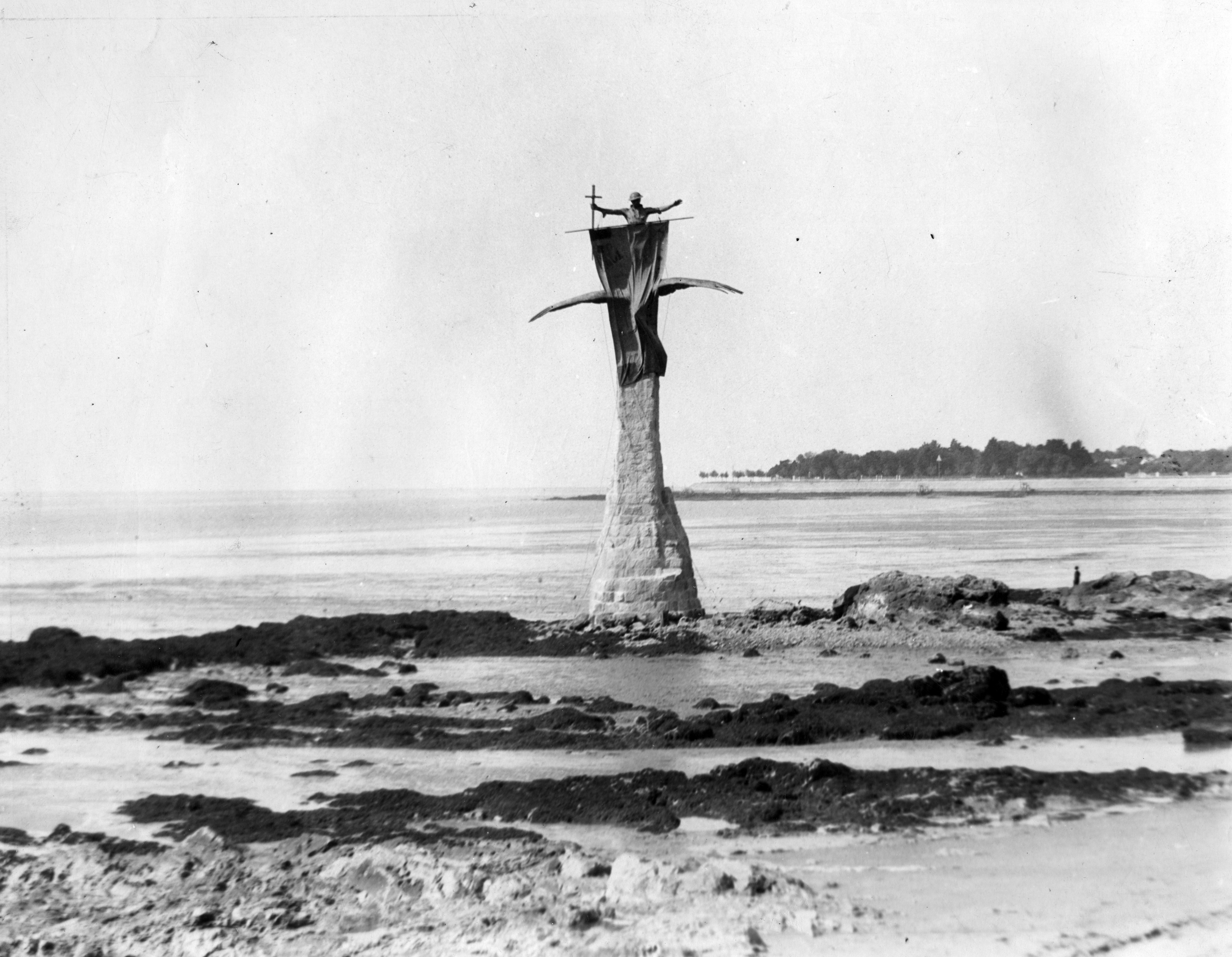
The original memorial ready for unveiling in 1926

The American Expeditionary Forces Memorial is a monument to the landing of the American Expeditionary Forces in France in 1917, during the First World War. It features a large bronze sculpture designed by Gertrude Vanderbilt Whitney. It was erected in Saint-Nazaire in 1926, destroyed in 1941 during the German occupation of France in the Second World War, and recreated and reinstalled in 1989.

== Background ==
The United States joined the First World War on 6 April 1917, and the first elements of the 1st Infantry Division disembarked near Saint-Nazaire on 26 June 1917 (the commander of the American Expeditionary Forces in Europe, Major General John J. Pershing, travelled separately and arrived in Boulogne-sur-Mer two weeks earlier).

After the war ended, a monument to the disembarkation was proposed in 1923 by the former US Army Major Roynon Cholmeley-Jones. The initial suggestion was for a large clock to be built in a square in the town of Saint-Nazaire, but that quickly changed to a bronze sculpture designed by Gertrude Vanderbilt Whitney. A 30 in (76 cm)–high maquette of the sculpture is held by the Preservation Society of Newport County. The bronze for the sculpture was cast and assembled at the Henri Rouaud art foundry in Paris.

== Description ==
The bronze sculpture, about 6 m (20 ft) high, depicts a "doughboy" – a youth in contemporary US Army uniform – standing with his arms outstretched, holding up a reversed sword like a cross in his right hand, standing on a soaring American eagle with a 10 m (33 ft) wingspan. The architect Albert Randolph Ross added a 15 m (49 ft)–tall plinth, made of Kersantite granite from Brittany. Vanderbilt and Ross had previously collaborated on the large stone plinth for her sculpture of Buffalo Bill – The Scout, commissioned in 1917 and completed in 1924. The cruciform figure, with arms outstreched, echoes the posture of the figure in her sculpture for the Titanic Memorial in Washington, D.C., commissioned in 1914 but only completed in 1931.

== Unveiling, destruction, and reinstatement ==
Funding of US$100,000 was raised by public subscription, and the resulting memorial was erected in 1926 on a rock in the sea beside the beach of Grand-Traict, on the north bank at the mouth of the River Loire. The boulevard du Président Wilson runs past (it was previously the boulevard de l'Océan and renamed in 1925). The unveiling was attended by Gertrude Vanderbilt and General Pershing, along with the US Ambassador Myron T. Herrick, and representatives of the French government and armed forces, including the Minister of the Navy Georges Leygues, the Minister of Public Works Charles Daniel-Vincent, General Henri Gouraud, and Admiral Maxime Le Vavasseur.

The memorial was destroyed in December 1941 by occupying Nazi German forces during the Second World War.

A proposal to rebuild the monument came to fruition in the 1980s, with the sculpture remade by Pierre Fouesnant and installed alongside plaques in English and French. The grandson of General Pershing, John J. Pershing, attended its unveiling on 24 June 1989, along with Jean-Pierre Chevènement, French Minister of Defense.
