= Monument to Columbus, Huelva =

Monument to Columbus
- Monumento a Colón
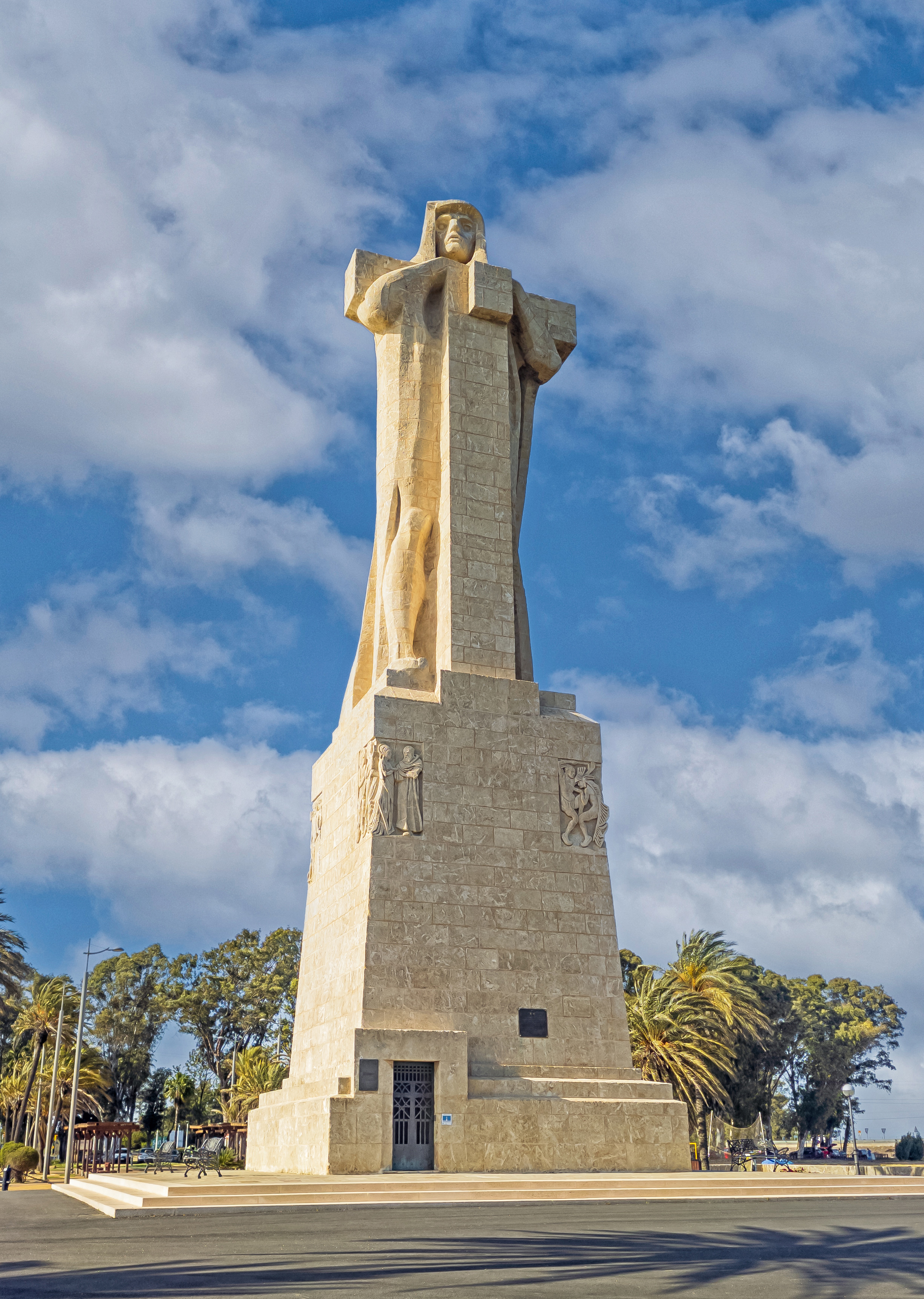
- 37°12′44″N 6°56′25″W
- Location: Huelva, Spain
- Designer: Gertrude Whitney
- Height: 37 m
- Beginning date: 1927
- Completion date: 1929
- Opening date: 21 April 1929
- Dedicated to: Christopher Columbus

The Monument to Columbus (Spanish: Monumento a Colón), also known as Monument to the Discovering Faith (Spanish: Monumento a la Fe Descubridora), is a monument in Huelva, Spain. It is a work by Gertrude Vanderbilt Whitney.

Funded via a popular subscription in the United States channeled by the Columbus Memorial Fund Inc., the monument, 37-metre high, was built from 1927 to 1929. Erected on the Punta del Sebo, the confluence of the Tinto and Odiel rivers, it was inaugurated on 21 April 1929, during a ceremony attended by Prime Minister Miguel Primo de Rivera and the US ambassador Ogden H. Hammond.

The sculpted man (leaning on a Tau cross) is sometimes described as representing a friar from La Rábida, yet it originally was described (including by the author herself) as a statue of Christopher Columbus.

It consists of a mortar structure covered by ashlar masonry (calcarenite).

== See also ==
- List of monuments and memorials to Christopher Columbus
