= Gertrude Vanderbilt Whitney =

American sculptor, art patron and collector (1875–1942)

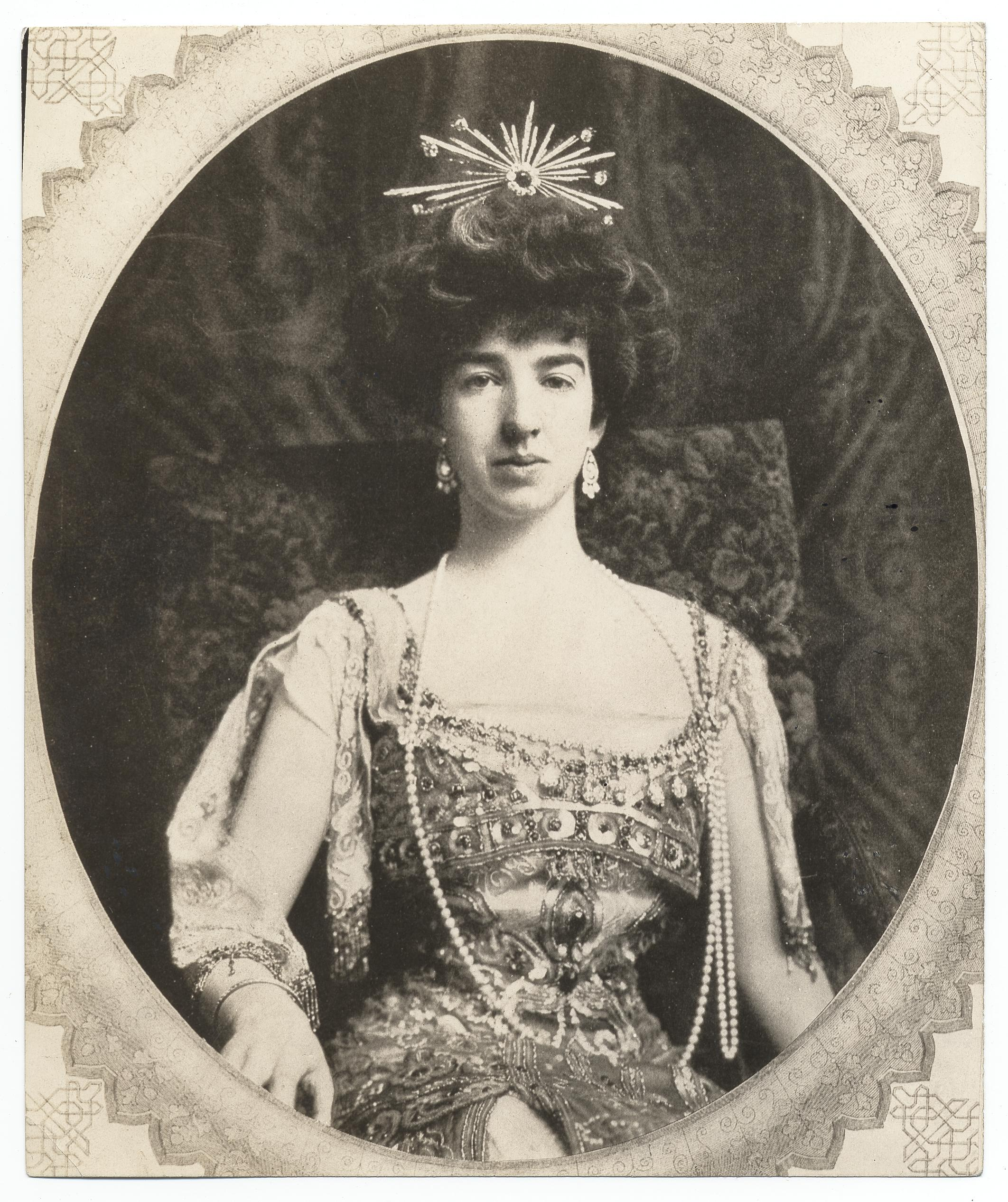
- Photograph of Whitney taken c. 1909
- Born: Gertrude Vanderbilt; January 9, 1875; New York City, U.S.
- Died: April 18, 1942 (aged 67); New York City, U.S.
- Occupations: Sculptor; Art collector
- Spouse: Harry Payne Whitney (m. 1896; died 1930)
- Children: Flora Whitney Miller; Cornelius Vanderbilt Whitney; Barbara Whitney Headley
- Parent(s): Cornelius Vanderbilt II; Alice Claypoole Gwynne
- Family: Vanderbilt

Gertrude Vanderbilt Whitney (January 9, 1875 – April 18, 1942) was an American sculptor, art patron and collector, and founder in 1931 of the Whitney Museum of American Art in New York City. She was a prominent social figure and hostess, who was born into the wealthy Vanderbilt family and married into the Whitney family.

== Early life ==
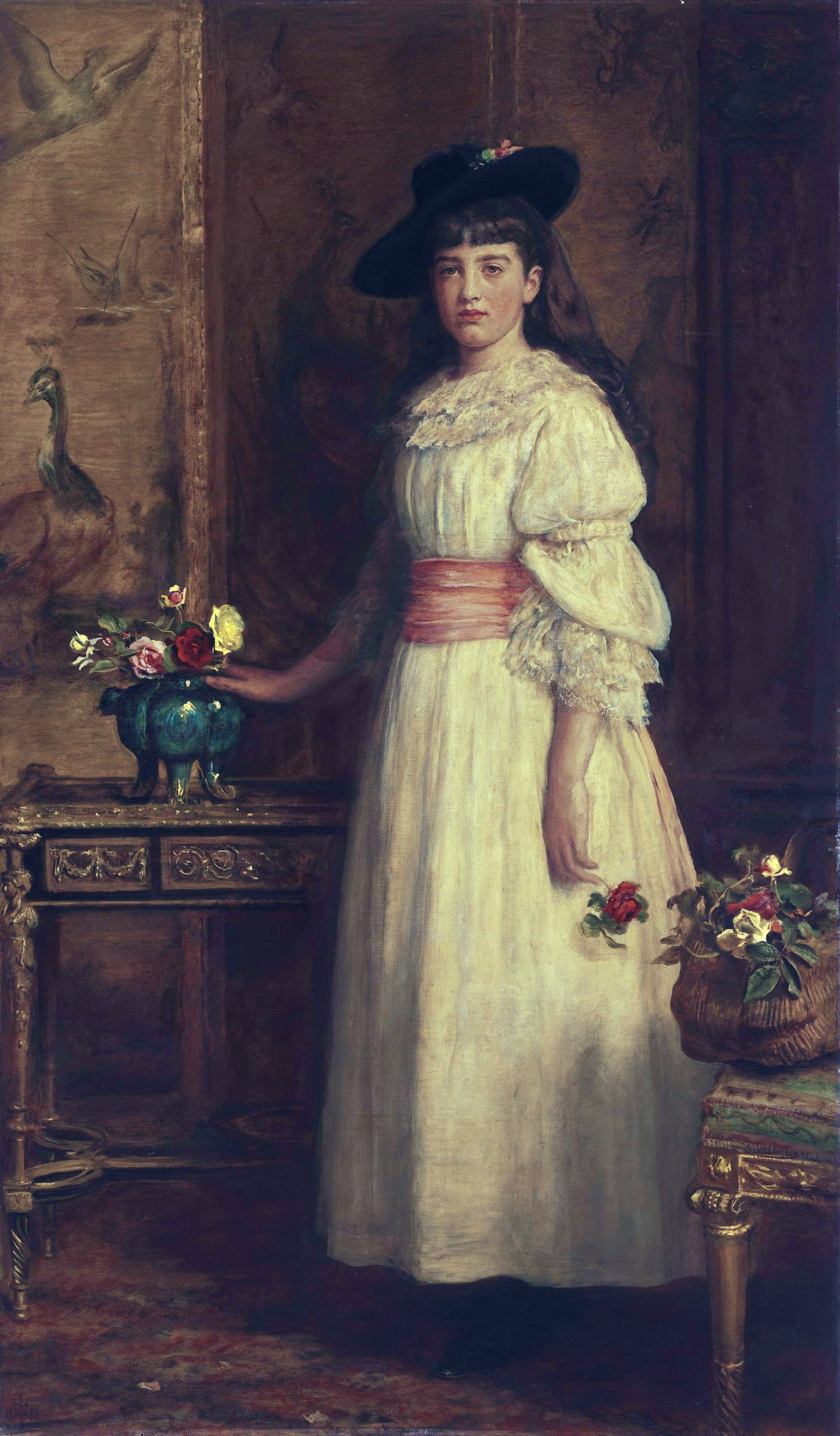
Gertrude, 13 years of age. (John Everett Millais, 1888)

Gertrude Vanderbilt was born on January 9, 1875, in New York City, the second daughter of Cornelius Vanderbilt II (1843–1899) and Alice Claypoole Gwynne (1852–1934), and a great-granddaughter of "Commodore" Cornelius Vanderbilt. Her older sister died before Gertrude was born, but she grew up with several brothers and a younger sister. The family's New York City home was an opulent mansion at 742–748 Fifth Avenue., also known as 1 West 57th Street. As a young girl, Gertrude spent her summers in Newport, Rhode Island, at the family's summer home, The Breakers, where she kept up with the boys in all their rigorous sporting activities. She was educated by private tutors and at the exclusive Brearley School for women students in New York City. She kept small drawings and watercolor paintings in her personal journals which were her first signs of being interested in the arts.

=== Education and early work ===
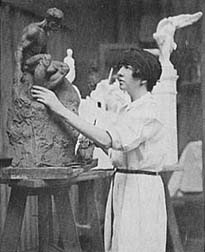
Gertrude Vanderbilt Whitney in her studio, c. 1920

While visiting Europe in the early 1900s, Gertrude Whitney discovered the burgeoning art world of Montmartre and Montparnasse in France. What she saw encouraged her to pursue her creativity and become a sculptor.

She studied at the Art Students League of New York with Hendrik Christian Andersen and James Earle Fraser. Other women students in her classes included Anna Vaughn Hyatt and Malvina Hoffman. In Paris she studied with Andrew O'Connor and also received criticism from Auguste Rodin. Her training with sculptors of public monuments influenced her later direction. Although her catalogs include numerous smaller sculptures, she is best known today for her monumental works.

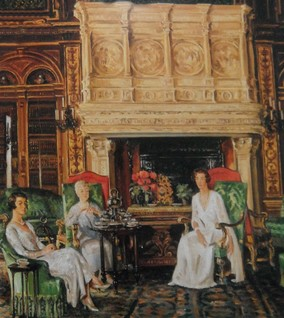
Mrs. Cornelius Vanderbilt, II and her daughters, Gladys and Gertrude, having tea in the library at the Breakers Newport, Rhode Island, William Bruce Ellis Ranken, 1932

Her first public commission was Aspiration, a life-size male nude in plaster, which appeared outside the New York State Building at the Pan-American Exposition in Buffalo, New York, in 1901. Initially she worked under an assumed name, fearing that she would be portrayed as a socialite and her work not taken seriously. Neither her family nor (after her marriage) her husband were supportive of her desire to work seriously as an artist. She once told an artist friend, "Never expect Harry to take your work seriously ... It never has made any difference to him that I feel as I do about art and it never will (except as a source of annoyance)." She believed that a man would have been taken more seriously as an artist, and that her wealth put her in a lose-lose situation: criticized if she took commissions because other artists were more needy, but blamed for undercutting the market for other artists if she was not paid.

In 1907, Whitney established an apartment and studio in Greenwich Village. She also set up a studio in Passy, a fashionable Parisian neighborhood in the XVI arrondissement.

By 1910, she was exhibiting her work publicly under her own name. Paganisme Immortel, a statue of a young girl sitting on a rock, with outstretched arms, next to a male figure, was shown at the 1910 National Academy of Design. Spanish Peasant was accepted at the Paris Salon in 1911, and Aztec Fountain was awarded a bronze medal in 1915 at the San Francisco Exhibition. Her first solo show occurred in New York City in 1916. The first charity exhibition she organized was in 1914 called the 50-50 Art Sale.

== World War I and its aftermath ==
During World War I, Gertrude Whitney dedicated a great deal of her time and money to various relief efforts, establishing and maintaining a fully operational hospital for wounded soldiers in Juilly, about 35 kilometres (22 mi) northwest of Paris in France.

While at this hospital, Gertrude Whitney made drawings of the soldiers which became plans for her memorials in New York City. Her work prior to the war had a much less realistic style, which she strayed away from to give the work a more serious feeling. In 1915, her brother Alfred Gwynne Vanderbilt perished in the sinking of the RMS Lusitania.

She completed a series of smaller pieces realistically depicting soldiers in wartime, but her smaller works were not seen as particularly significant during her lifetime; her choice to depict the subjects as nudes was criticized. Since her death critics have recognized the expert craftsmanship of her smaller works.

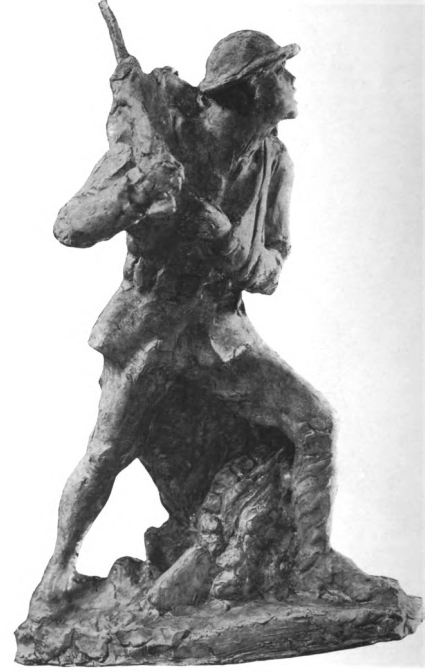
Chateau Thierry

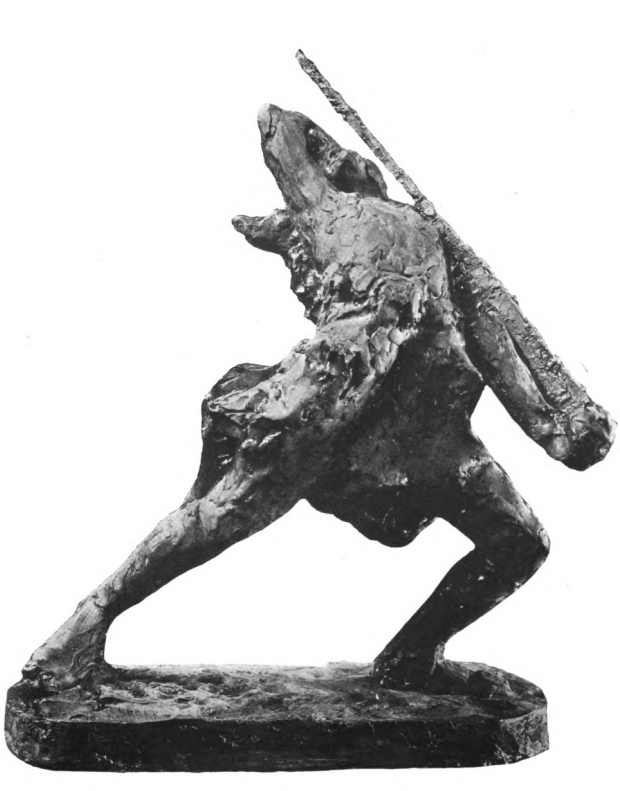
His Last Charge

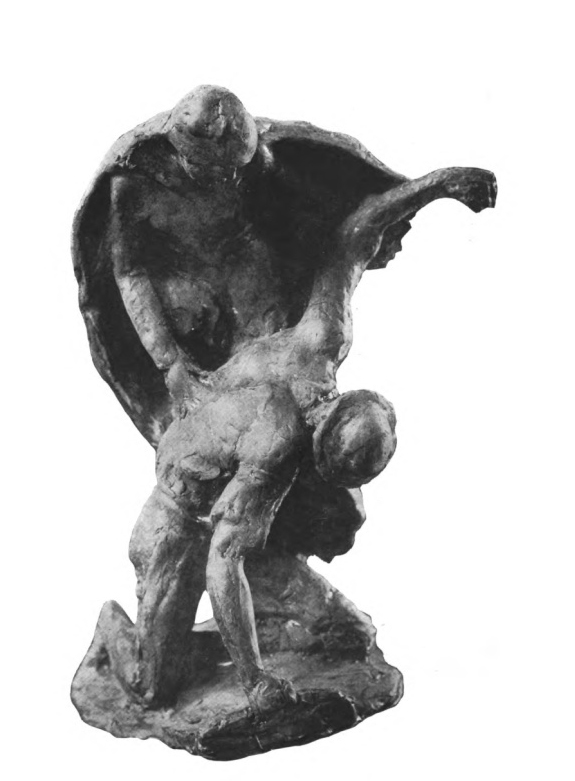
Found

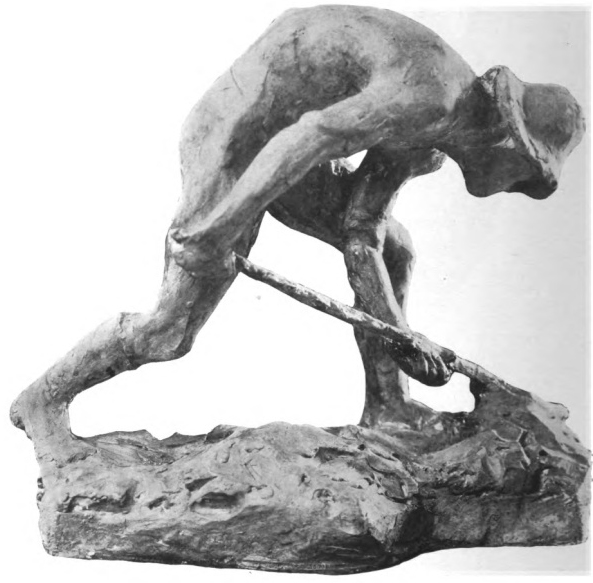
Engineers

In addition to participating in shows with other artists, Whitney held a number of solo exhibitions during her career. These included a show of her wartime sculptures at her Eighth Street Studio in November 1919; a show at the Art Institute of Chicago, March 1 to April 15, 1923; and one in New York City, March 17–28, 1936. The majority of works created in this period of her work were made in her studio in Paris. The Whitney Museum of American Art held a commemorative show of her works in 1943.

=== Sculptures from her 1936 show ===
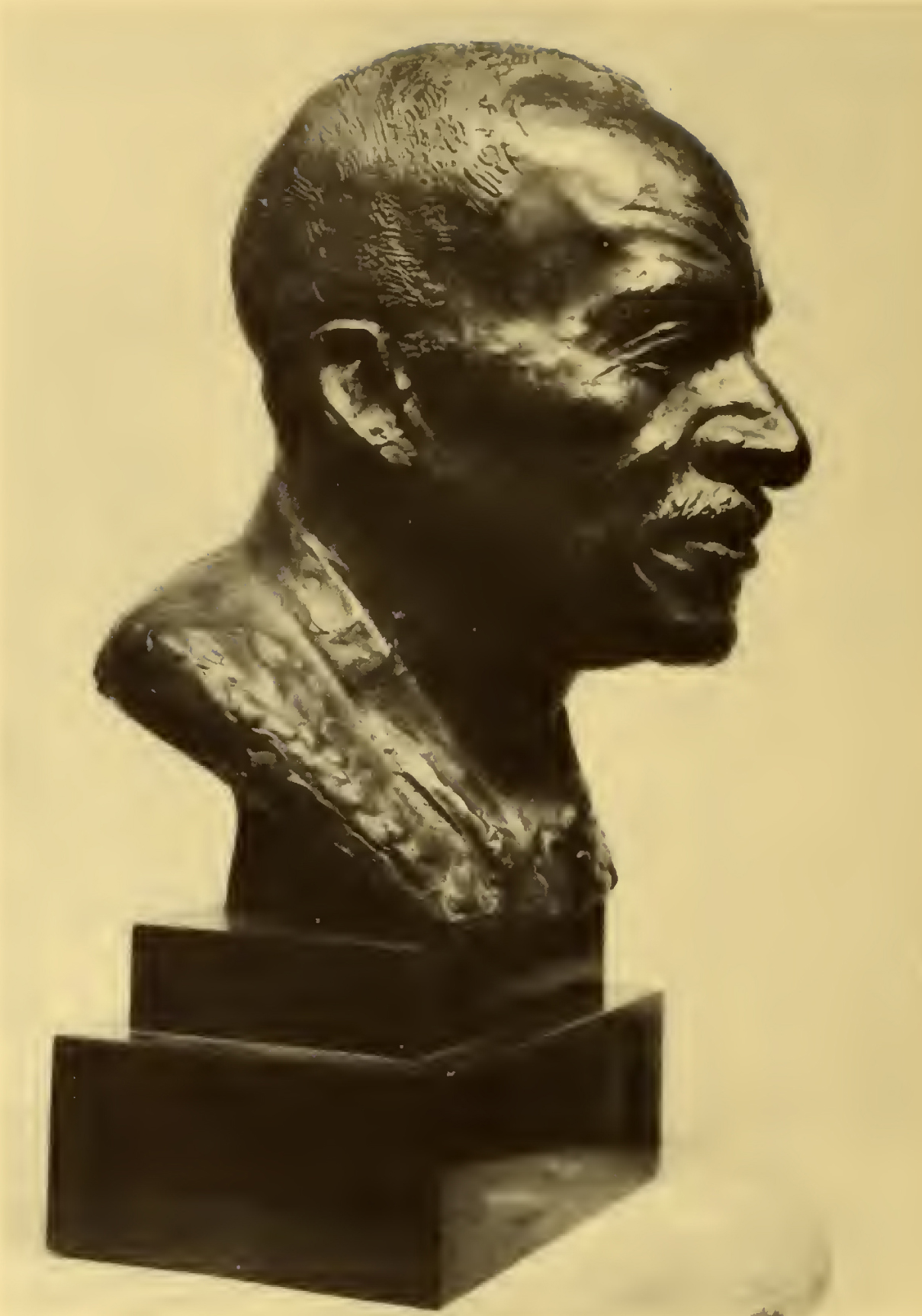
John

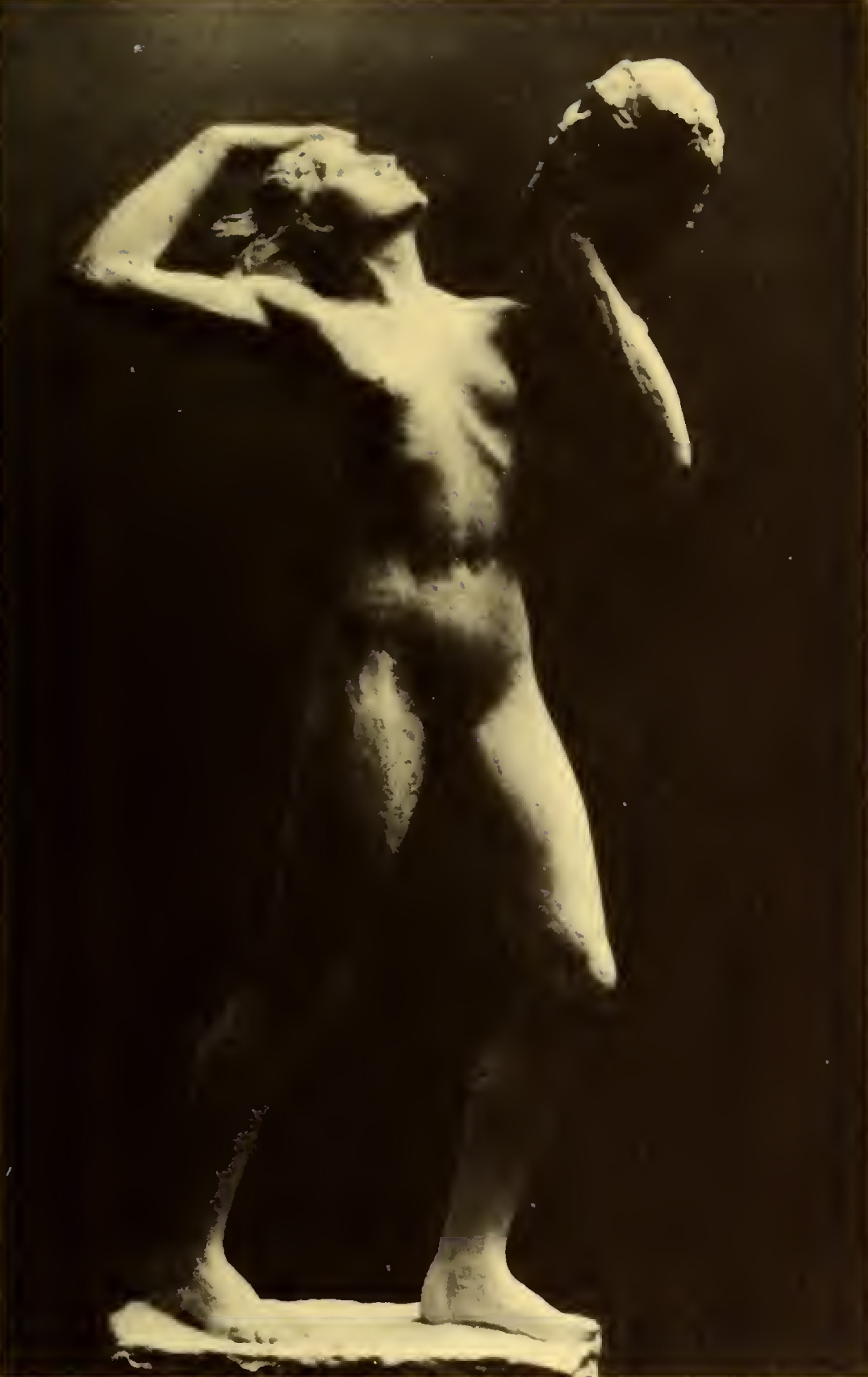
Salome

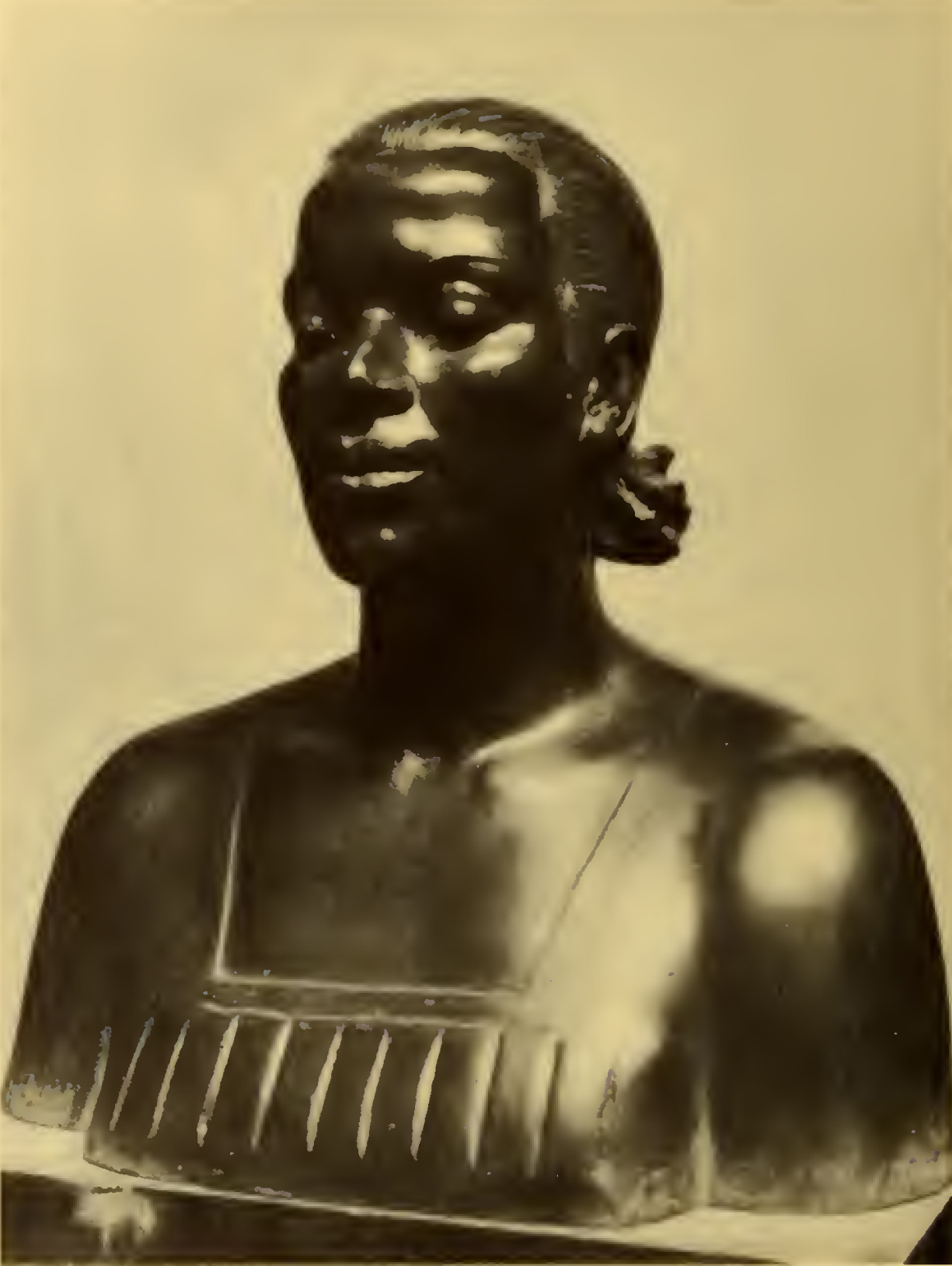
Gwendolyn

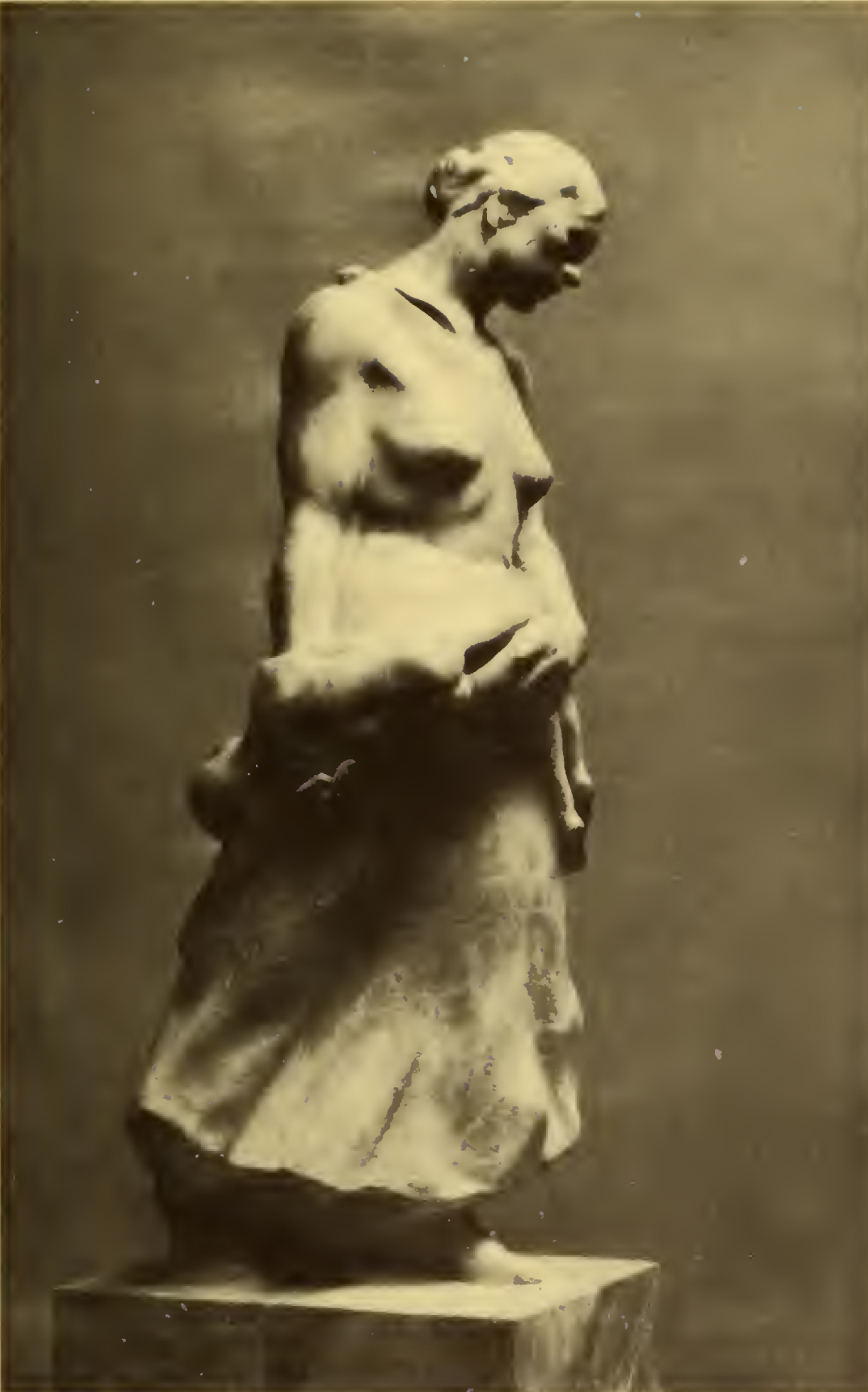
Mother and Child

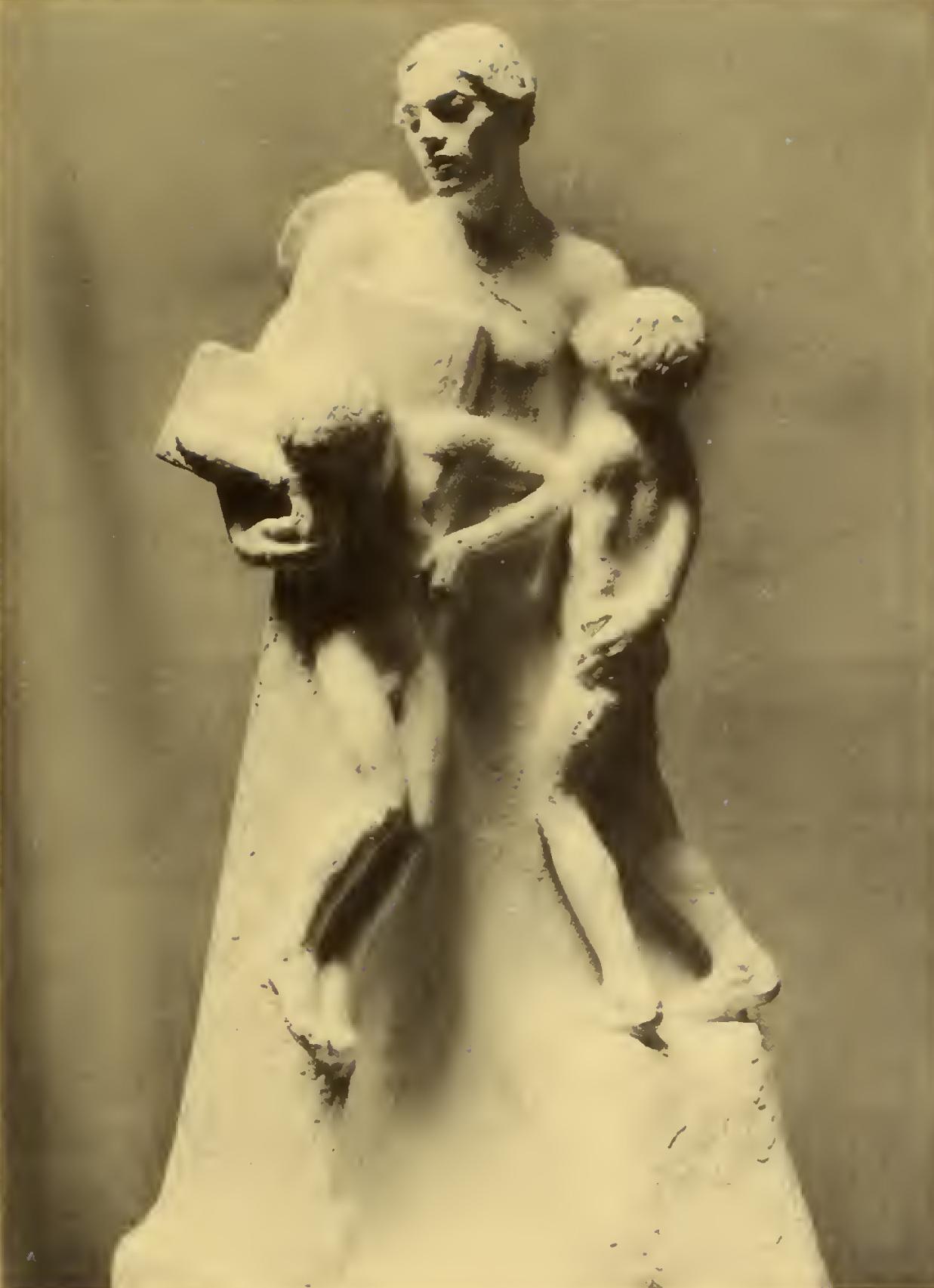
Untitled

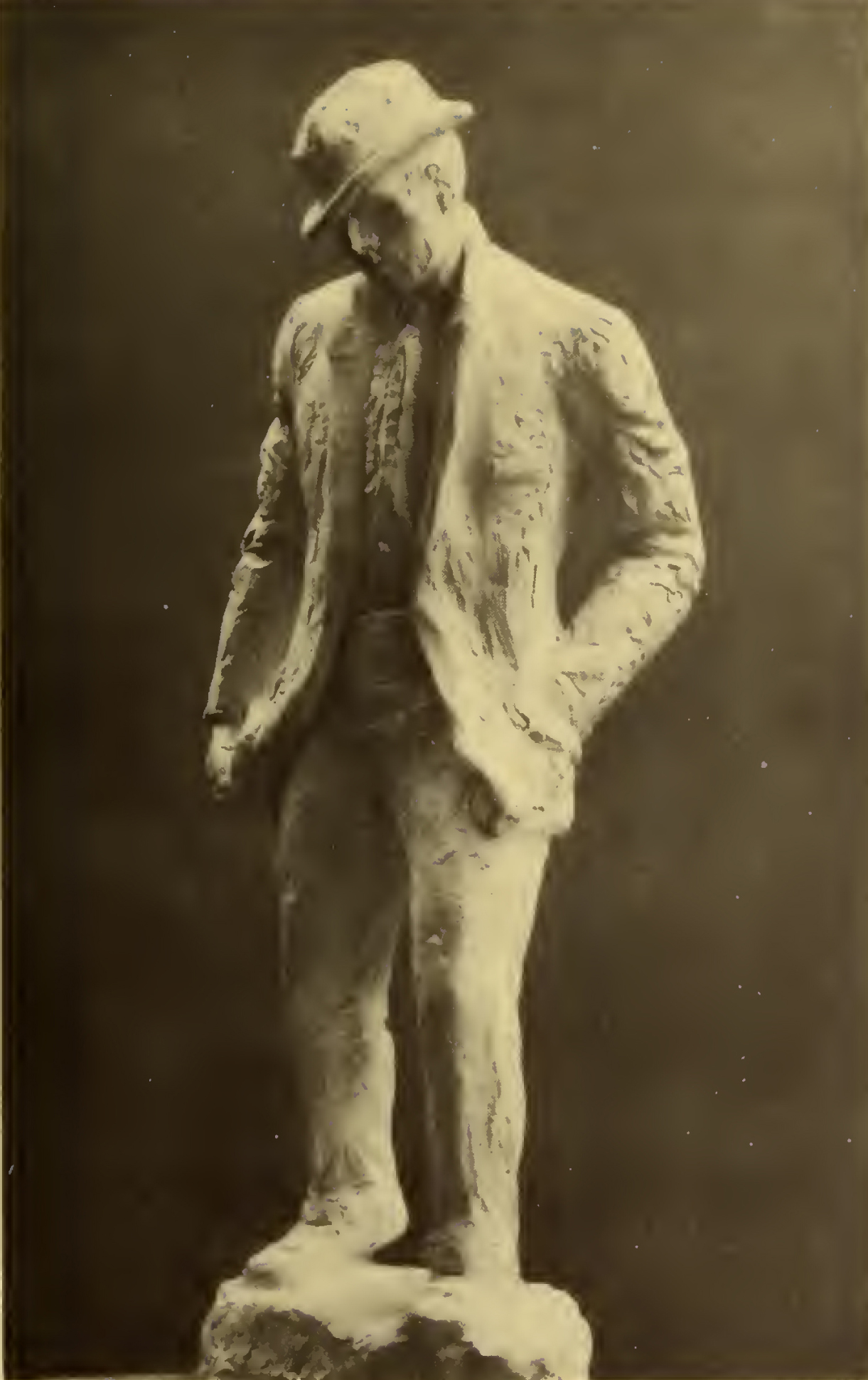
Sketch

=== Public sculptures ===
Following the end of the War, Whitney was also involved in the creation of a number of commemorative sculptures. During the 1920s, her works received critical acclaim both in Europe and the United States, particularly her monumental works. During the 1930s, the popularity of monumental pieces declined. Whitney's last pieces of public art were the Spirit of Flight, created for the New York World's Fair of 1939, and the Peter Stuyvesant Monument in New York City.

Gertrude Vanderbilt Whitney's numerous works in the United States include:

- Aztec Fountain – Pan American Union Building, Washington, D.C., 1912
- Fountain of El Dorado – 1915 Panama-Pacific Exposition, San Francisco, California
- Two reliefs on the Victory Arch – Madison Square, New York City, 1918–19
- Washington Heights-Inwood War Memorial – Mitchell Square Park, Washington Heights, New York City, erected 1922
- Buffalo Bill - The Scout, William F. Cody Memorial – Cody, Wyoming, dedicated 1924
- Untermyer Memorial, Woodlawn Cemetery, New York City, 1925
- The Founders of the Daughters of the American Revolution, a memorial honoring the four founders – Constitution Hall, Washington, D.C., dedicated 1929; Whitney was a member of the Daughters of the American Revolution.
- Titanic Memorial – Washington, D.C., unveiled 1931
- Peter Stuyvesant Monument, New York City, 1936–1939
- To the Morrow, vt. Wings, vt. Spirit of Flight, created for the World's Fair in New York, 1939
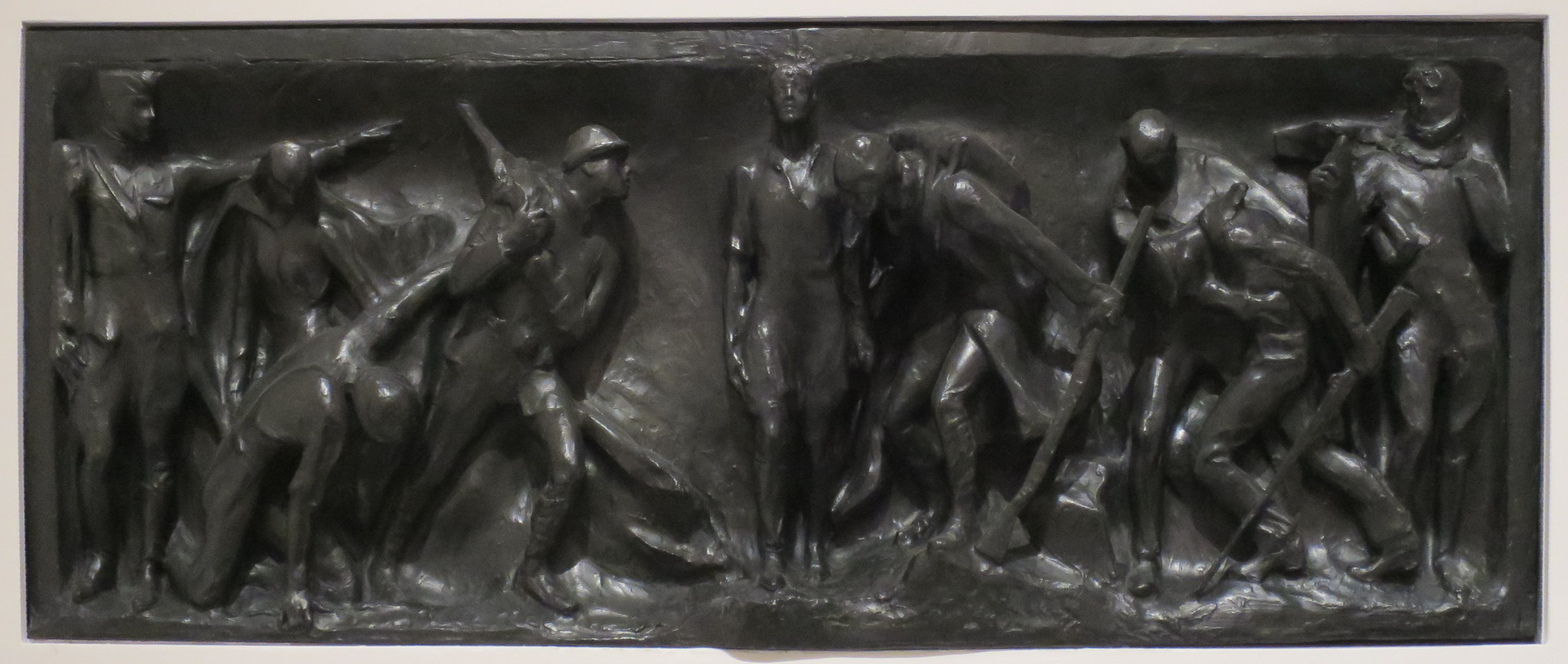
Victory Arch, one of two bronze reliefs, New York City

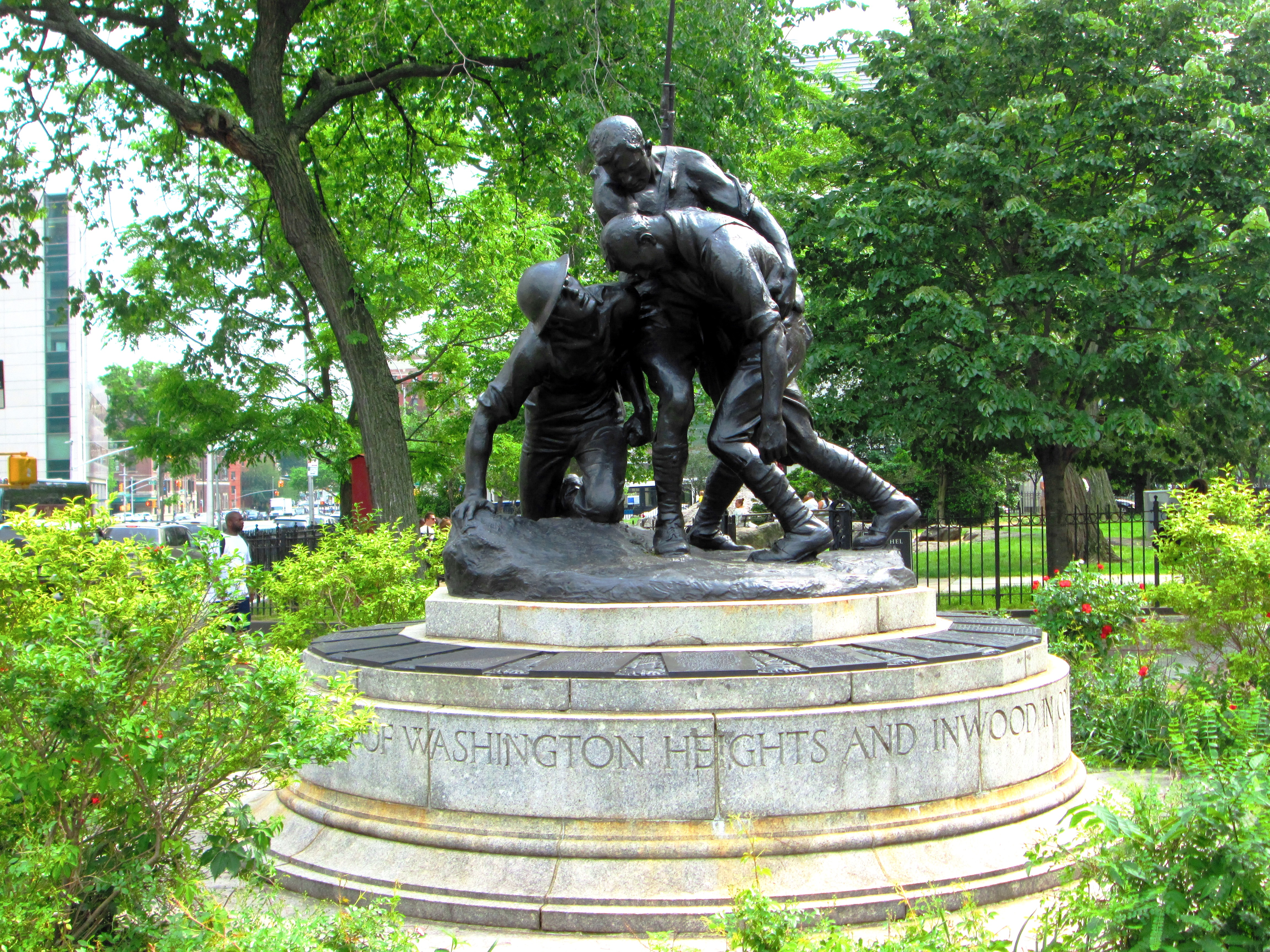
Washington Heights-Inwood War Memorial (World War I), New York City

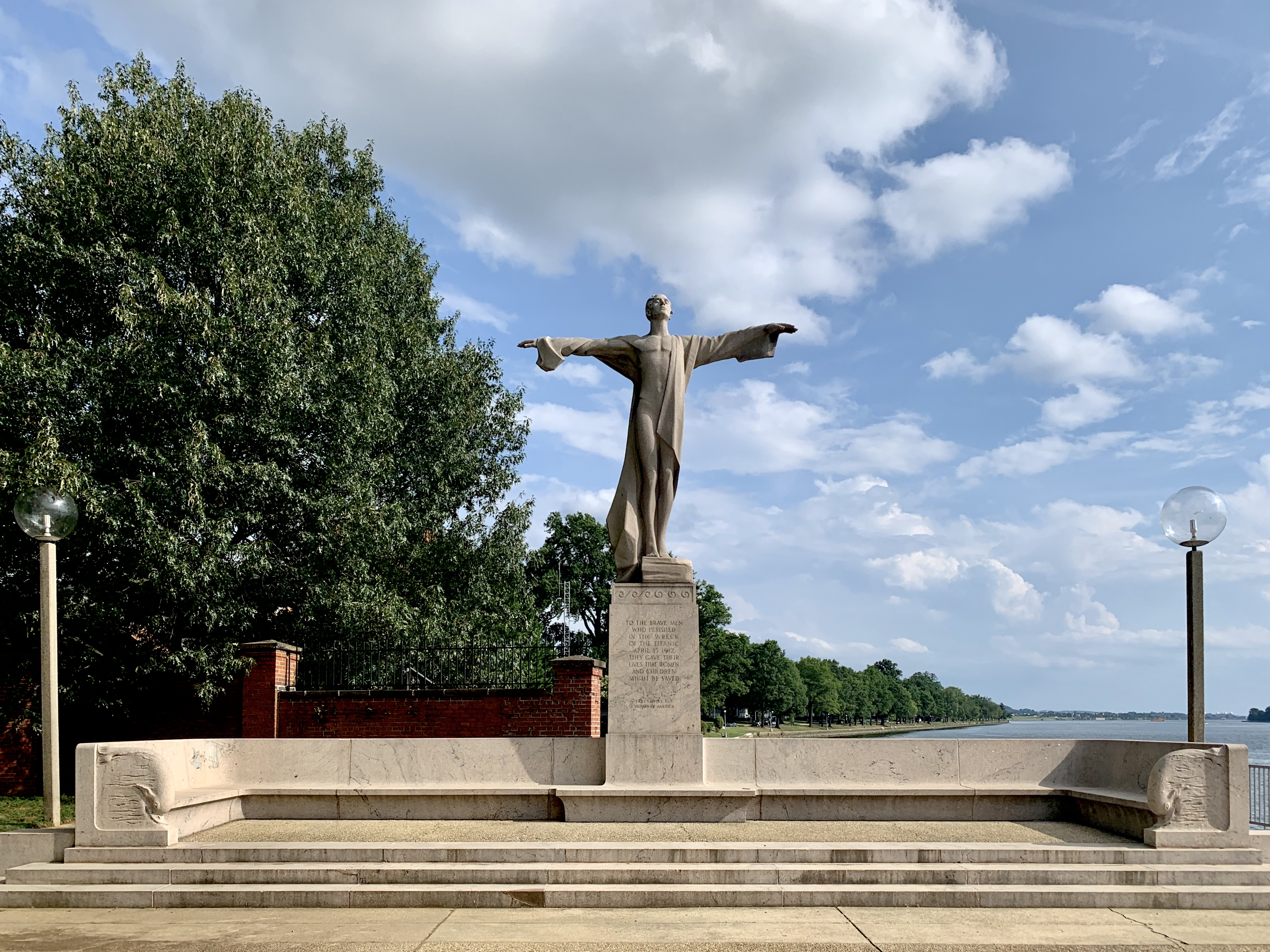
Titanic Memorial, Washington, D.C.

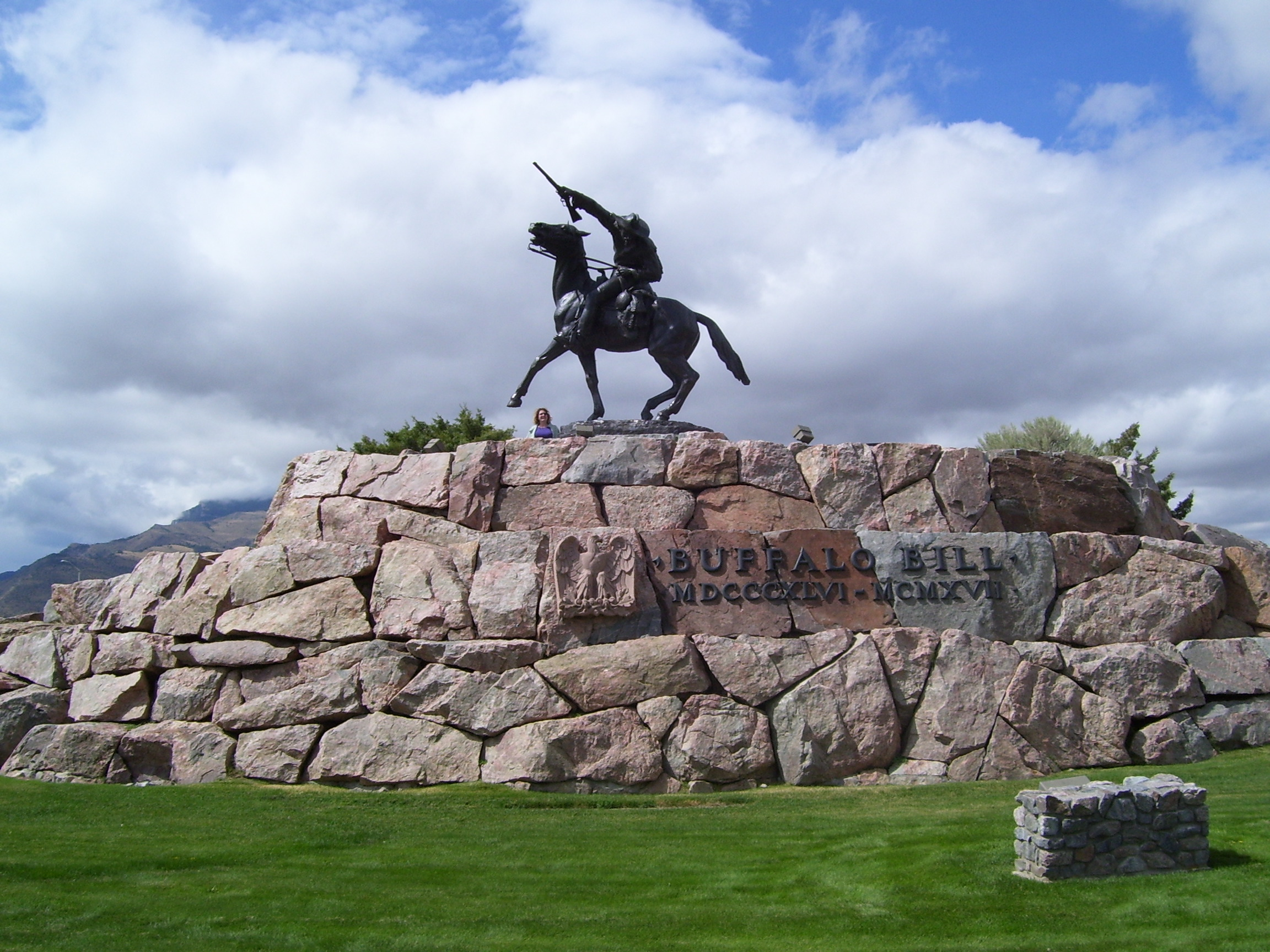
Buffalo Bill - The Scout, Cody, Wyoming

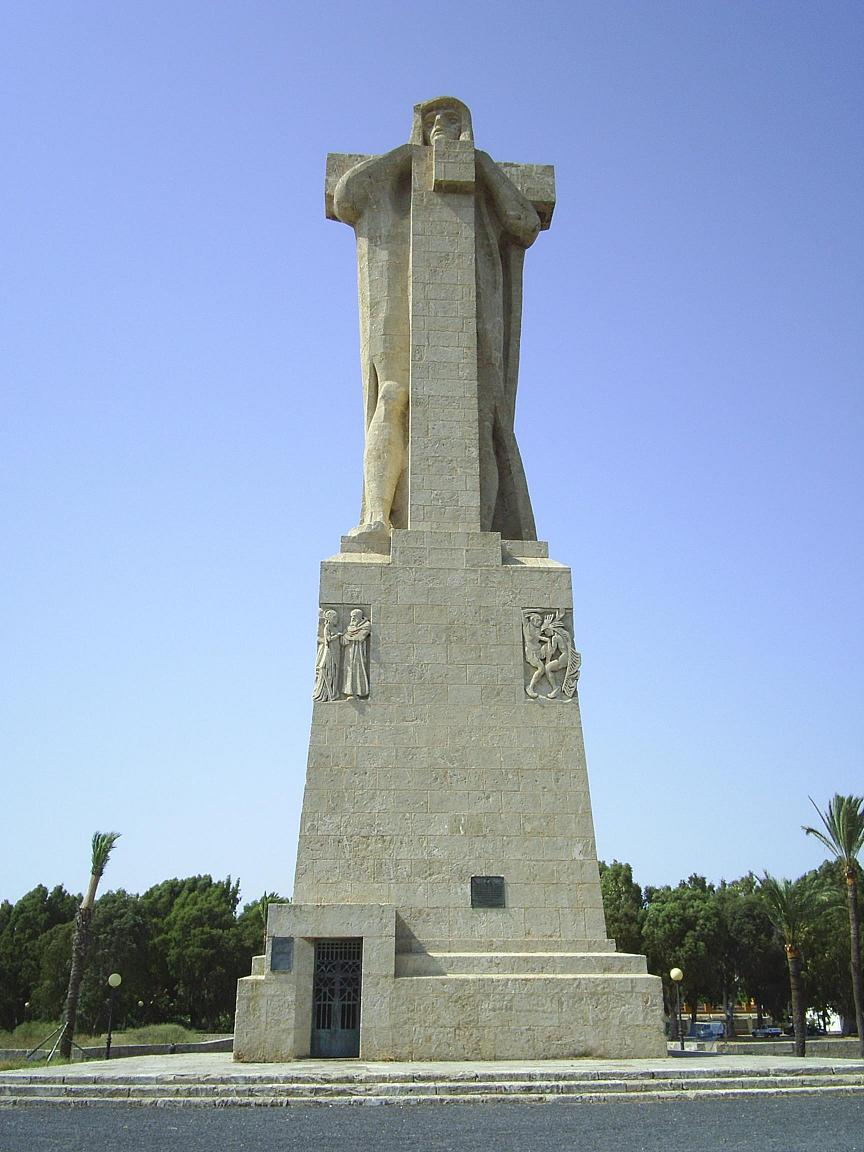
Monument to Columbus, Huelva, Spain

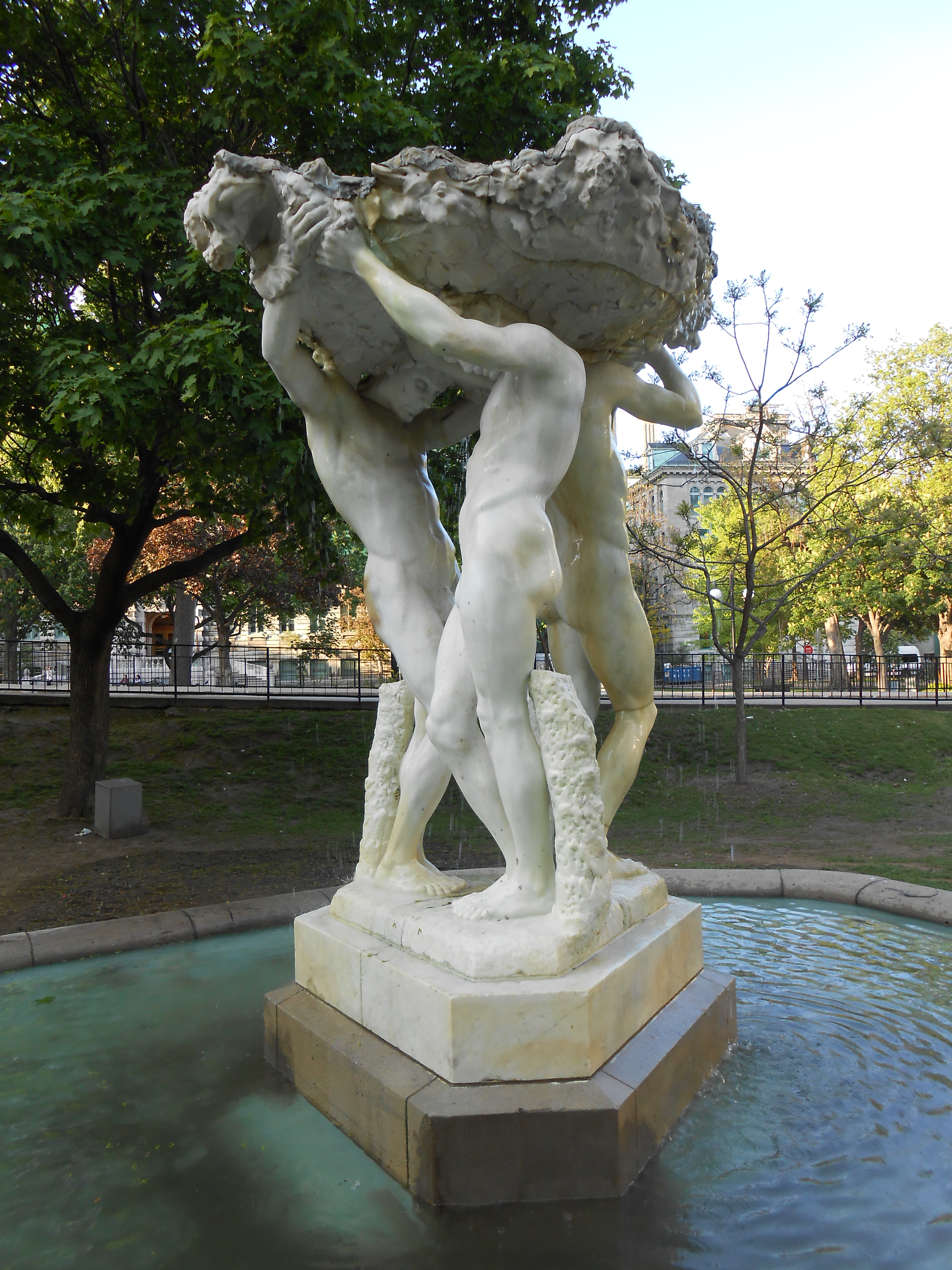
The Three Graces, McGill University, Montreal, Quebec, Canada

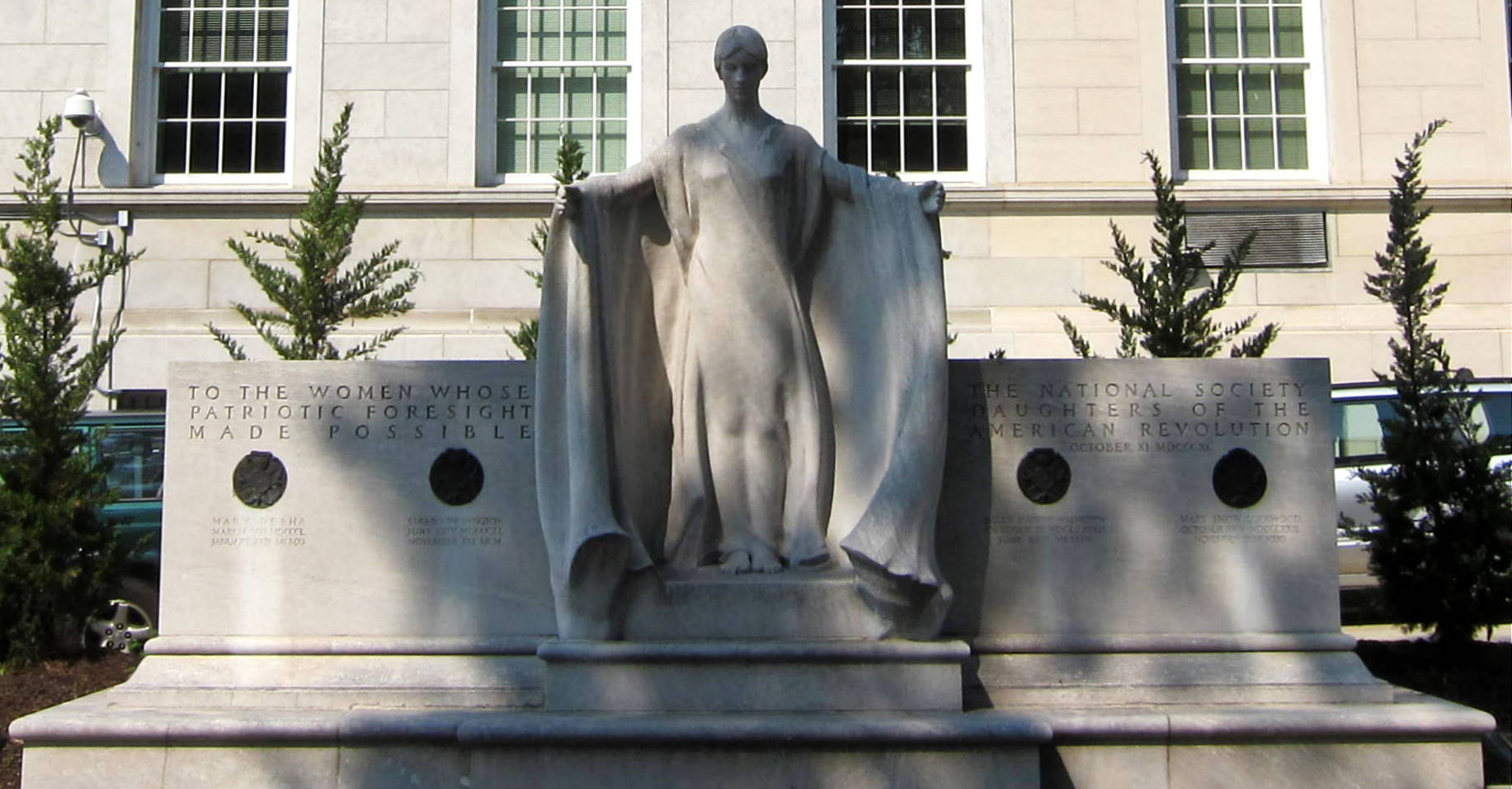
The Founders of the Daughters of the American Revolution, Washington, D.C.

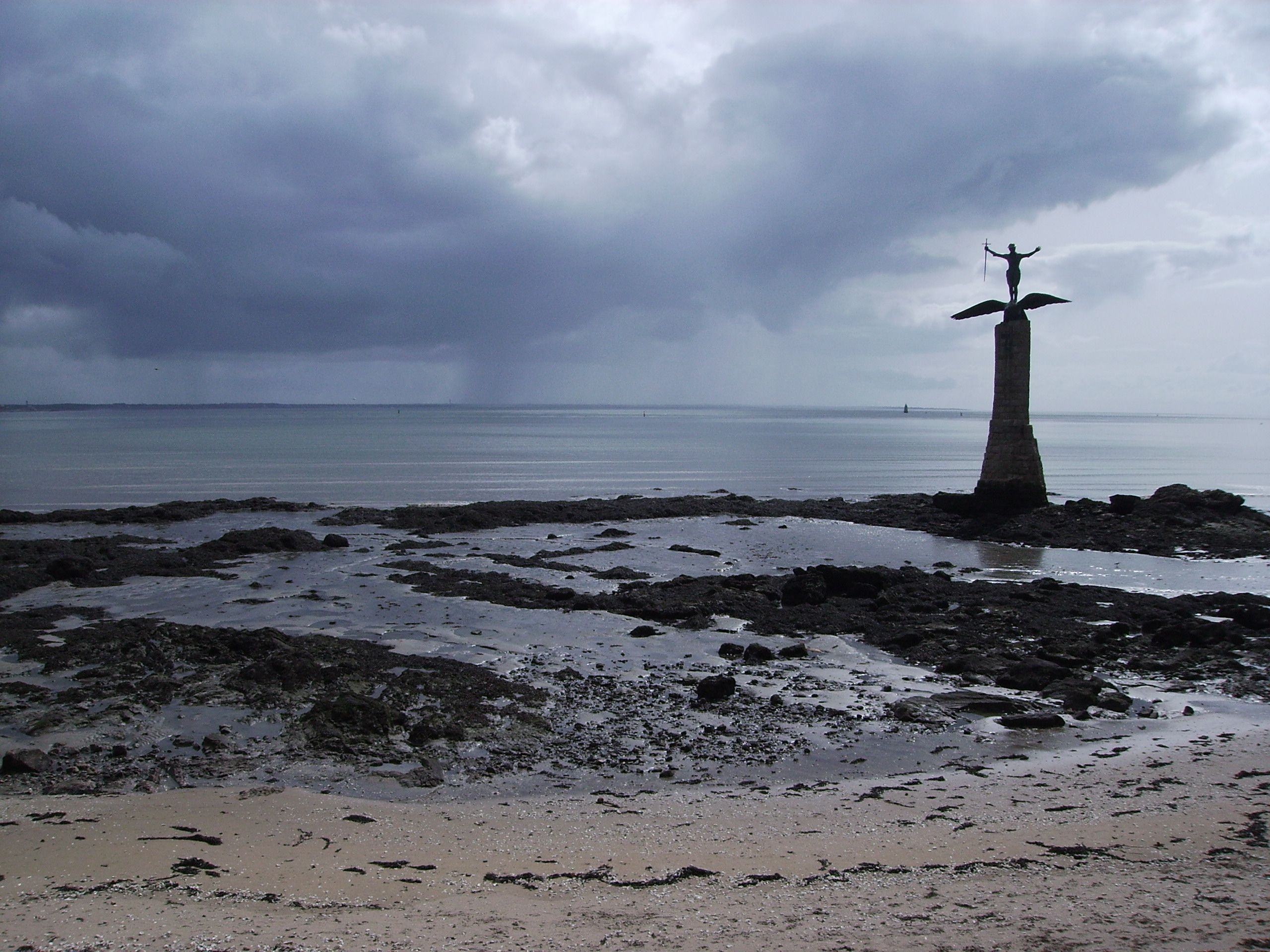
American Expeditionary Forces Memorial, Saint-Nazaire, France

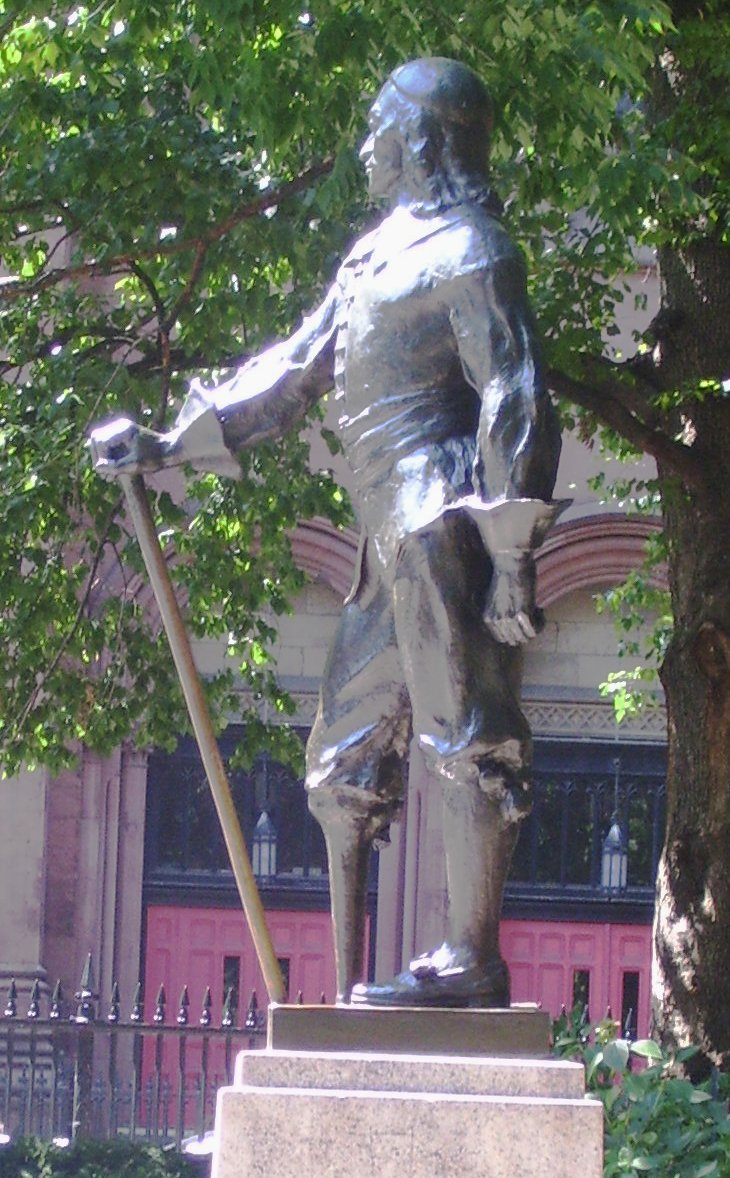
Peter Stuyvesant, New York City

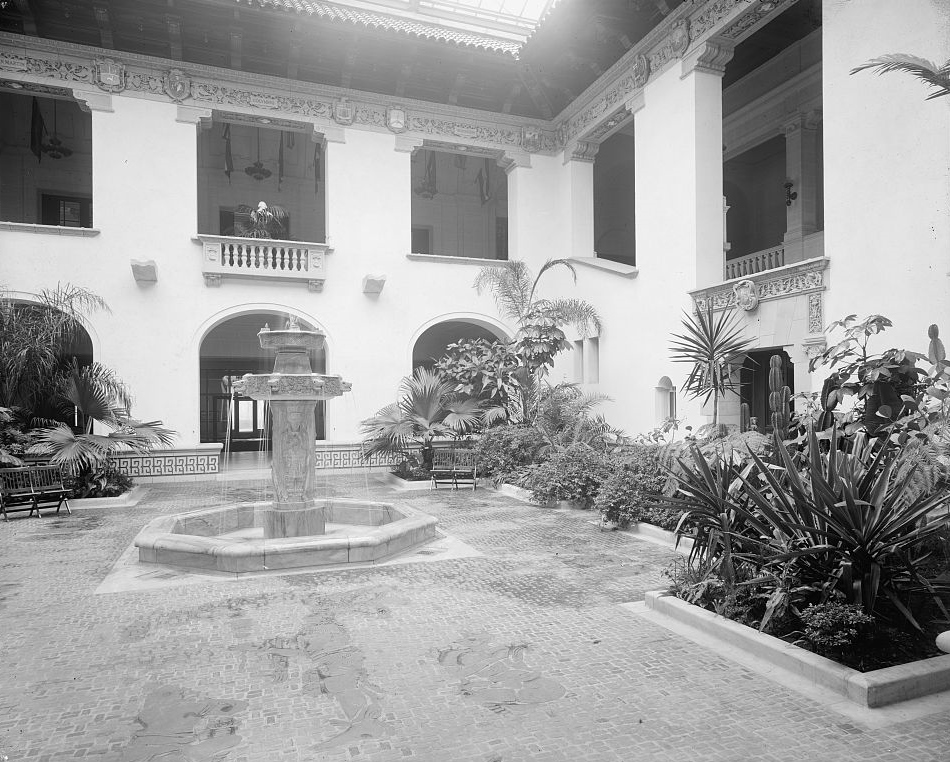
Aztec fountain, Pan American Union Building, Washington, D.C.

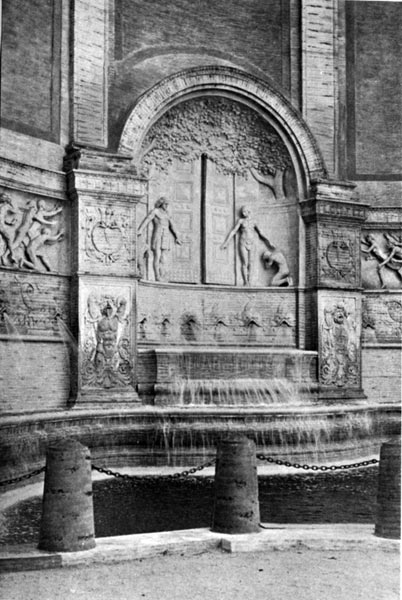
Fountain of El Dorado, detail, 1915 Panama-Pacific Exposition

Whitney's Titanic Memorial is considered by critics as the most important achievement in her artistic career. The statue was built from a $50,000 prize from a competition that she won in 1914.

Whitney also created works which are now in other countries, including the American Expeditionary Forces Memorial in St. Nazaire Harbor in Saint-Nazaire, France (1924). The Government of France purchased a marble replica of the head of the Titanic Memorial, which is now housed in the Musée du Luxembourg.

Whitney sculpted the Christopher Columbus memorial, the Monument to Columbus (also known as "Monument to the Discovery Faith"), in Huelva, Spain (1928–1933). With a cubist style, it is one of her biggest works.

In 1931 Whitney presented the Caryatid Fountain to McGill University in Montreal, Quebec, Canada. The fountain is also referred to as The Good Will Fountain, The Friendship Fountain, The Whitney Fountain, The Three Graces and, because it consists of three nude males, The Three Bares. There is also a bronze version of this fountain in Washington Square in Lima, Peru.

== Influence in art ==
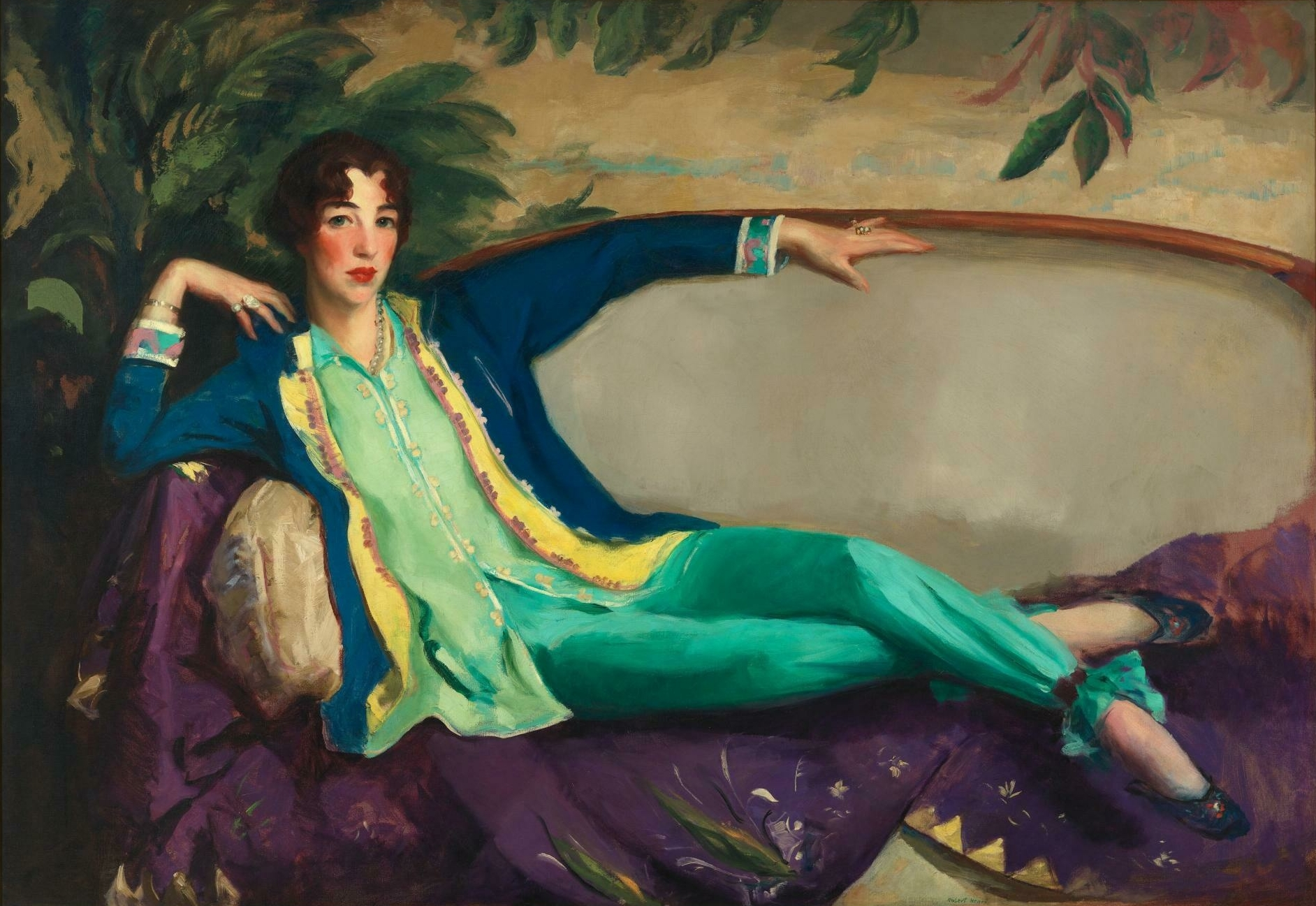
Robert Henri, Gertrude Vanderbilt Whitney, 1916

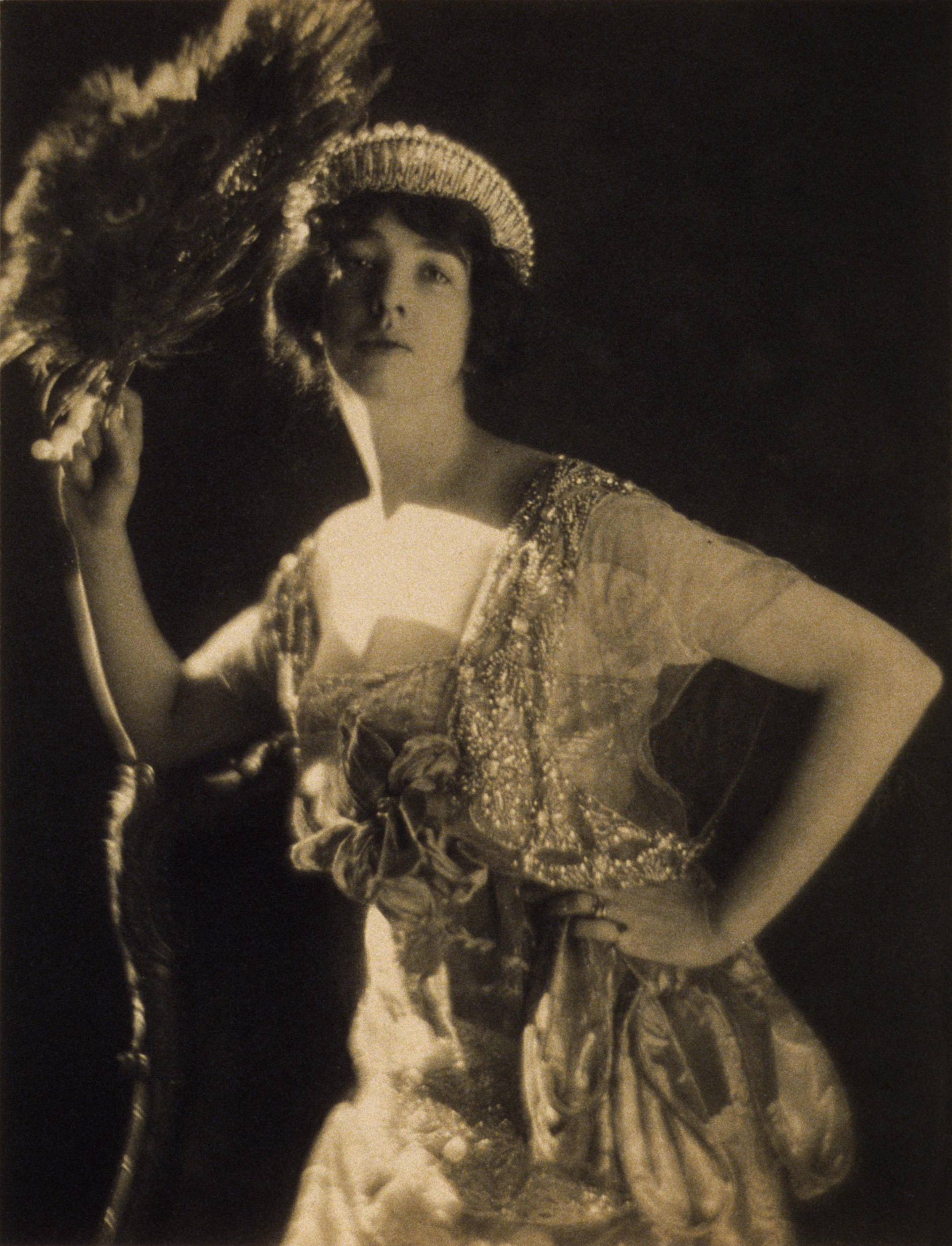
Gertrude Vanderbilt Whitney, in Vogue magazine, by Adolf de Meyer, January 15, 1917

Her great wealth afforded her the opportunity to become a patron of the arts, but she also devoted herself to the advancement of women in art, supporting and exhibiting in women-only shows and ensuring that women were included in mixed shows. She supported exhibition of artwork both locally and around the country, including the 1913 Armory Show in New York. Whitney also donated money to the Society of Independent Artists founded in 1917, which aimed to promote artists who deviated from academic norms. She actively bought works from new artists including the Ashcan School. In 1922, she financed publication of The Arts magazine, to prevent its closing. She was the primary financial backer for the "International Composer's Guild," an organization created to promote the performance of modern music.

By 1908, Whitney had opened the Whitney Studio Gallery in the same buildings as her own studio on West Eighth Street in Greenwich Village. Artists such as Robert Henri and Jo Davidson were invited to showcase their works there. In 1914, Gertrude Whitney also established the Whitney Studio Club at 147 West 4th Street, as an artists' club where young artists could meet and talk, as well as exhibit their works. She provided nearby housing many of them, as well as stipends for living costs at home and abroad. The Whitney Studio Club expanded again when its headquarters were moved back from West Fourth Street to West Eighth Street in 1923. Thus, the club expanded both in size and scope of programming. These early galleries would evolve to become Whitney's greatest legacy, the Whitney Museum of American Art, on the site of what is now the New York Studio School of Drawing, Painting and Sculpture.

In 1929, Whitney offered the New York Metropolitan Museum of Art the donation of her twenty-five-year collection of nearly 700 American modern art works and full payment for building a wing to accommodate these works. Her offer was declined because the museum would not take American art, and in 1931, Whitney decided to create her own museum by renovating and expanding on one of her own studios. Whitney appointed Juliana Force, who was formerly her assistant since 1914, to be the museum's first director. The museum aimed to embrace modernism, shifting away from the notions that American art was largely rural and narrow in scope.

A colorful recollection of one of her parties celebrating her artist friends was recounted by the artist Jerome Myers:

Matching it in memory is a party at Mrs. Gertrude Vanderbilt Whitney's, on her Long Island estate, the artists there a veritable catalog of celebrities, painters and sculptors. I can hardly visualize, let alone describe, the many shifting scenes of our entertainment: sunken pools and gorgeous white peacocks as line decorations spreading into the gardens; in their swinging cages, brilliant macaws nodding their beaks at George Luks as though they remembered posing for his pictures of them; Robert Chanler showing us his exotic sea pictures, blue-green visions in a marine bathroom; and Mrs. Whitney displaying her studio, the only place on earth in which she could find solitude. Here the artists felt at home, the Whitney hospitality always gracious and sincere.

Her Greenwich Village studio has been named a National Treasure by the National Trust for Historic Preservation, giving it landmark status.

When Whitney died in 1942, the Whitney Museum of American Art was cleared of the debt it owed her and granted $2.5 million of her money.

== Personal life ==
Gertrude had a dear friend named Esther in her youth with whom a number of love letters were uncovered which made explicit the desires both had for a physical relationship that surpassed friendship. Esther was the daughter of Richard Morris Hunt, the architect who had built Gertrude's family home in New York City and summer home—The Breakers—in Newport, Rhode Island, as well as many of the other Vanderbilts' mansions. Gertrude considered it one of the "thrills of my life, when Esther kissed me," and her mother, Alice, was so concerned about the friendship that she forbade Gertrude to see Esther. The separation seemed to have worked; for while Esther continued to write heartbroken letters of longing, Gertrude went on to have a bevy of male beaux.

At age 21, on August 25, 1896, she married the extremely wealthy sportsman Harry Payne Whitney (1872–1930). A banker and investor, Whitney was the son of politician William Collins Whitney and Flora Payne, the daughter of former U.S. Senator from Ohio Henry B. Payne, and sister to a Standard Oil Company magnate. Harry Whitney inherited a fortune in oil and tobacco as well as interests in banking. In New York, the couple lived in town houses originally belonging to William Whitney, first at 2 East 57th St., across the street from Gertrude's parents, and after William Whitney's death, at 871 Fifth Avenue. They also had a country estate in Old Westbury, Long Island. Gertrude and Harry Whitney had three children:

- Flora Payne Whitney (1897–1986)
- Cornelius Vanderbilt Whitney (1899–1992)
- Barbara Whitney (1903–1983; m. 1960, to George W. Headley).

Harry Whitney died of pneumonia in 1930, at age 58, leaving an estate valued at approximately $72 million. The bulk of the fortune was left in Trust for their three children; Gertrude received a life interest in their Manhattan townhouse at 871 Fifth Avenue.

In 1934, she was at the center of a highly publicized court battle with her brother Reginald's widow, Gloria Morgan Vanderbilt, for custody of her ten-year-old niece, Gloria Vanderbilt. Gertrude Vanderbilt Whitney did win custody of her niece at the end of the custody battle.

Gertrude Whitney died on April 18, 1942, at age 67, and was interred next to her husband in Woodlawn Cemetery in The Bronx, New York City. The reported cause of her death was from a heart condition. Her daughter Flora Whitney Miller assumed her mother's duties as head of the Whitney Museum, and was succeeded by her daughter, Flora Miller Biddle.

=== Wealth ===
==== Inheritance ====
Following the death of Gertrude's father Cornelius Vanderbilt II in 1899, she inherited a quarter-share of a $20,000,000 trust fund along with her siblings Alfred, Reginald and Gladys, from which she would enjoy a life interest in the trust's income. She also received $1,480,000 outright from a $5,000,000 Trust fund which her grandfather William H. Vanderbilt I had provided her father in his will; Alfred, Reginald and Gladys also each received $1,480,000 outright from this trust, whilst their elder brother Cornelius Vanderbilt III's share of this trust was $500,000; during the years between the deaths of Gertrude's grandfather William H. Vanderbilt I in 1885 and that of her father in 1899, the value of this trust had grown to $6,420,000. As a mark of special affection, Gertrude's father also made an additional provision in his will bequeathing a $1,000,000 lump sum to Gertrude.

Following the death of her mother Alice Claypoole Vanderbilt in 1934, Gertrude received $150,000 under the terms of Alice's will.

==== Estate ====
Following her death, Gertrude Vanderbilt Whitney's will was submitted for probate to the Surrogate's Court of New York County in May 1942. Although contemporary newspapers estimated the value of her estate at $25 to $50 million, an interim accounting of her estate submitted to the court by her executors in 1943 put the value of the estate at $10,590,492.

The majority of Gertrude's estate was left to charity and her three children; bequests in her will included:

- $2,500,000 outright to the Whitney Museum;
- Approximately $1,000,000 of real estate she owned in Long Island, Manhattan and Newport to be divided equally between her three children;
- $50,000 to her friend Juliana Force, who was the founding director of the Whitney Museum;
- $15,000 to her former maid Marie Pfitzer;
- $10,000 to her Chauffeur Fred Stone
- $50,000 to the Newport Hospital; and,
- A diamond bracelet each to her nieces Catheleen Vanderbilt Lowman and Gloria Vanderbilt;

The residuary estate was placed in a Trust for charitable purposes, with her three children appointed as Trustees. Gertrude did not exercise a power of appointment provided to her over a $5,000,000 trust fund which she enjoyed the income from under the terms of her father's will, and the Trust vested in equal shares between her children.

=== Awards and honors ===
- Medal of Award at Panama-Pacific Exhibition for Fountain of El Dorado, 1915
- Associate member of National Sculpture Society, 1916
- Medal from the New York Society of Architects for the Mitchel Square World War I memorial, 1923
- Honorary degree, New York University, 1922
- Honorary degree, Tufts University, 1924
- Bronze medallion at Paris Salon for Buffalo Bill – The Scout, 1924
- French Legion of Honor medal, 1926
- Honorary degree, Rutgers University, 1934
- Elected an honorary member of the American Institute of Architects, 1934
- Honorary degree, Russell Sage College, 1940
- Associate of National Academy of Design, 1940
- Medal of Honor of the National Sculpture Society, 1940

== In popular culture ==
In the 1982 television miniseries Little Gloria... Happy at Last, Whitney was portrayed by actress Angela Lansbury, who earned an Emmy nomination for her performance.

In 1999, Gertrude Whitney's granddaughter, Flora Miller Biddle, published a family memoir entitled The Whitney Women and the Museum They Made. She was also the subject of B. H. Friedman's 1978 Gertrude Vanderbilt Whitney: A Biography.
