= Whitney Museum of American Art (original building) =

Building in Manhattan, New York

Coordinates: 40.73295°N 73.998306°W

- Whitney Museum of American Art (original building); currently New York Studio School of Drawing, Painting and Sculpture
- U.S. National Register of Historic Places
- U.S. National Historic Landmark
- U.S. Historic district – Contributing property
- New York State Register of Historic Places
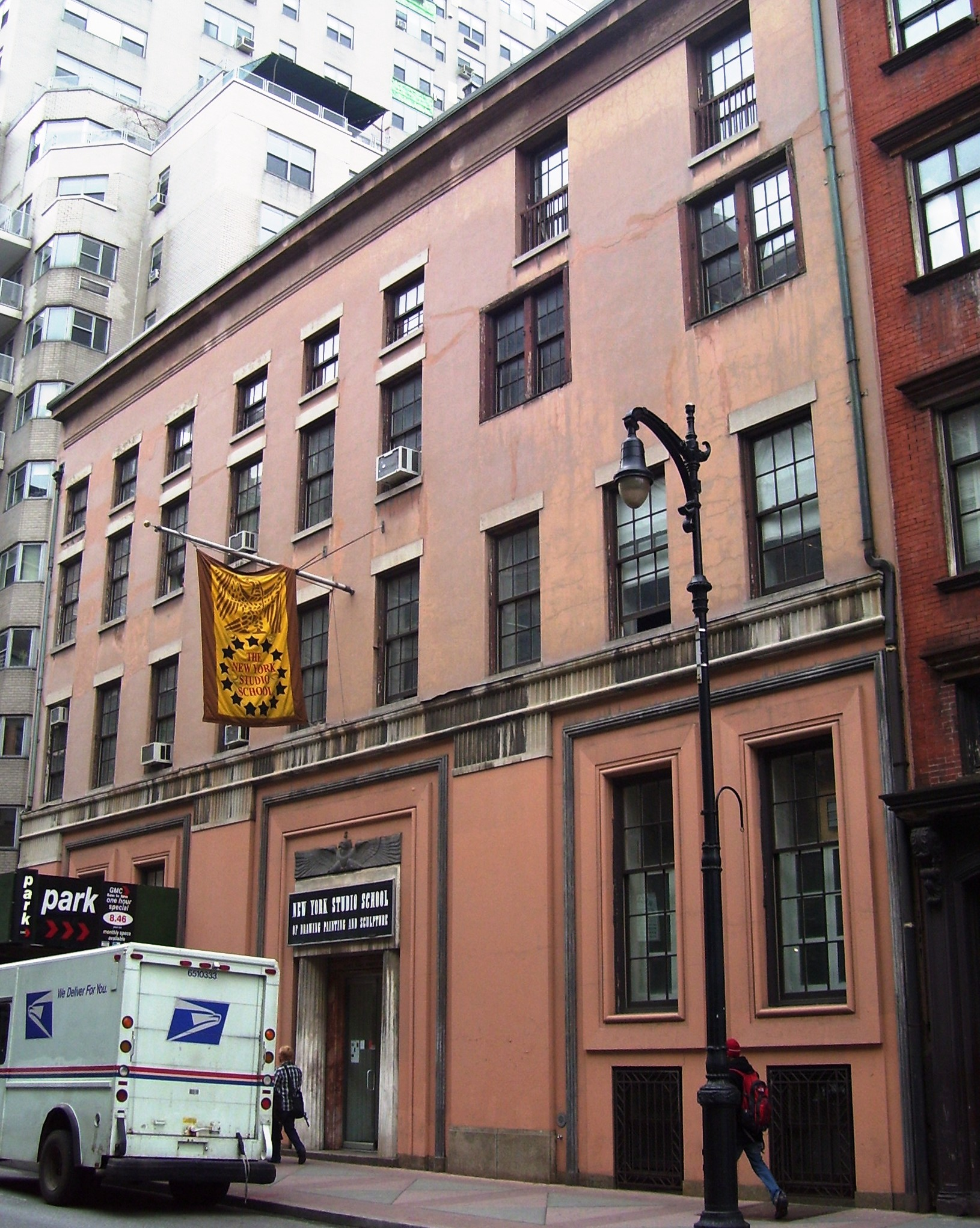
- (2011)

- Location within Manhattan Location within New York City Location within New York Location within the United States
- Location: 8–12 West 8th Street; Manhattan, New York City
- Built: 1838 (original buildings); 1931 (remodeled into gallery and residence); 1936 (remodeled into museum)
- Architect: Auguste L. Noel of Noel & Miller (1931 and 1936)
- Architectural style: Neoclassical
- Part of: Greenwich Village Historic District (ID79001604)
- NRHP reference No.: 92001877
- NYSRHP No.: 06101.005903

Significant dates
- Added to NRHP: April 27, 1992
- Designated NHL: April 27, 1992
- Designated NYSRHP: January 1, 1993

The Whitney Museum of American Art's original building is a collection of three 1838 rowhouses at 8–12 West 8th Street, between Fifth Avenue and MacDougal Street, in the Greenwich Village neighborhood of Manhattan in New York City. In 1907, Gertrude Vanderbilt Whitney converted a stable on MacDougal Alley (no. 19 at the time) into a studio for herself, which in 1914 she connected with the adjacent townhouse at 8 West 8th street, all the while exhibiting the work of progressive young American artists. This Whitney Studio Gallery, with the later Whitney Studio Club at 147 West 4th Street, which in 1923 moved to West 8th Street, were intended to provide young artists with places to meet and exhibit their works.

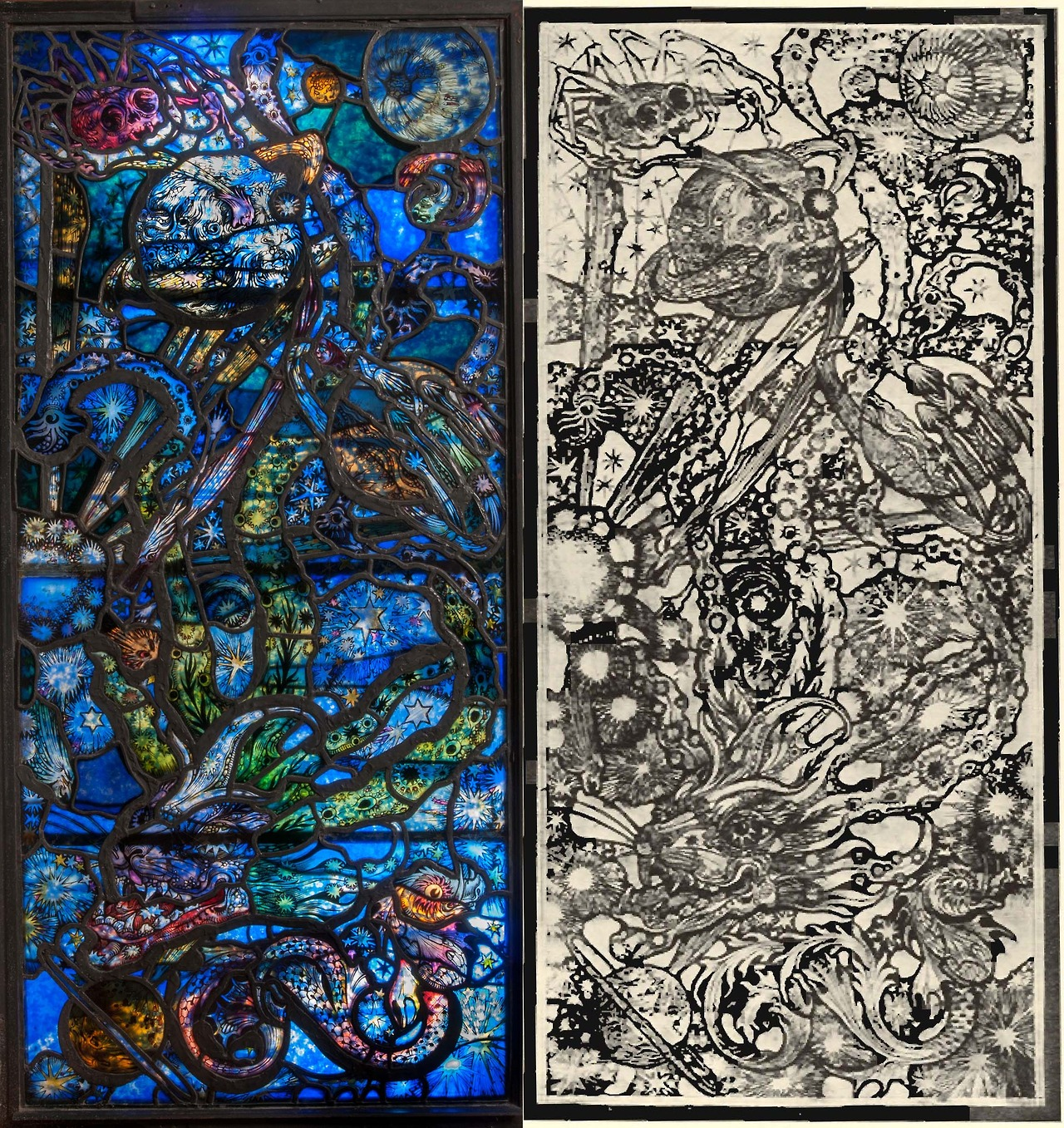
Stained glass window (and sketch) by Robert Winthrop Chanler, originally in the Whitney Studio

In 1918, American artist and friend Robert Winthrop Chanler was commissioned to redesign the interior of the 8th Street property, adorning her studio with an allegorical bas-relief ceiling, a 20-foot-high plaster and bronze fireplace, elaborate stained glass windows, and decorative screens.

In 1929, when the Metropolitan Museum of Art rejected Whitney's offer of the gift of nearly 500 new artworks that she had collected, Whitney established the Whitney Museum of American Art. In 1931, she had architect Auguste L. Noel of the firm of Noel & Miller convert the three row houses at 8–12 West 8th Street into a gallery and residence for herself, and the museum's first home. The museum opened November 18, 1931. The Whitney bought 12 and 14 West 8th Street in 1943.

In the 1940s, there were failed plans to incorporate the collections of the Whitney into the Metropolitan Museum of Art for the latter's 75th anniversary. In 1954, the museum moved uptown to new quarters on 54th Street between 5th and 6th Avenues, before eventually settling in 1966 at 945 Madison Avenue. The old building – with the addition of 14 West 8th Street, an Italianate house built in 1853–54 – became the New York Studio School of Drawing, Painting and Sculpture.

The building is located within the Greenwich Village Historic District, established in 1969 by the New York City Landmarks Preservation Commission, and was declared a National Historic Landmark in 1992. Listed on the World Monuments Fund's 2012 Watch list, it has been the focus of an extensive restoration project on the part of the University of Pennsylvania's Architectural Conservation Laboratory, in collaboration with the fund.

== Image gallery ==
These photographs, from a 1937 museum publication, show the museum as it was at the time:

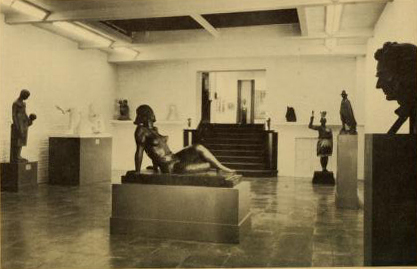
Sculpture gallery

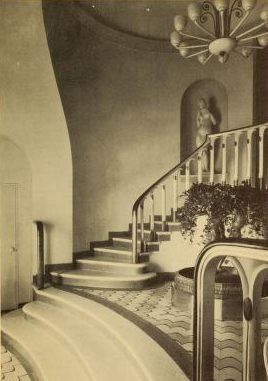
Staircase

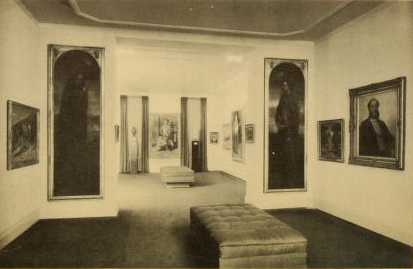
Painting gallery

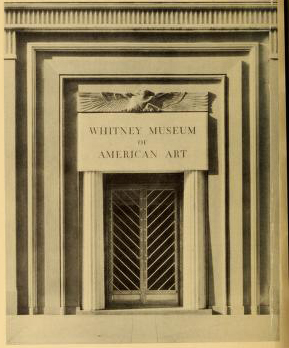
Doorway, circa 1937

== See also ==
- National Register of Historic Places listings in New York County, New York
