= St. Nicholas Avenue =

Avenue in Manhattan, New York

Coordinates: 40°49′39.67″N 73°56′33.56″W

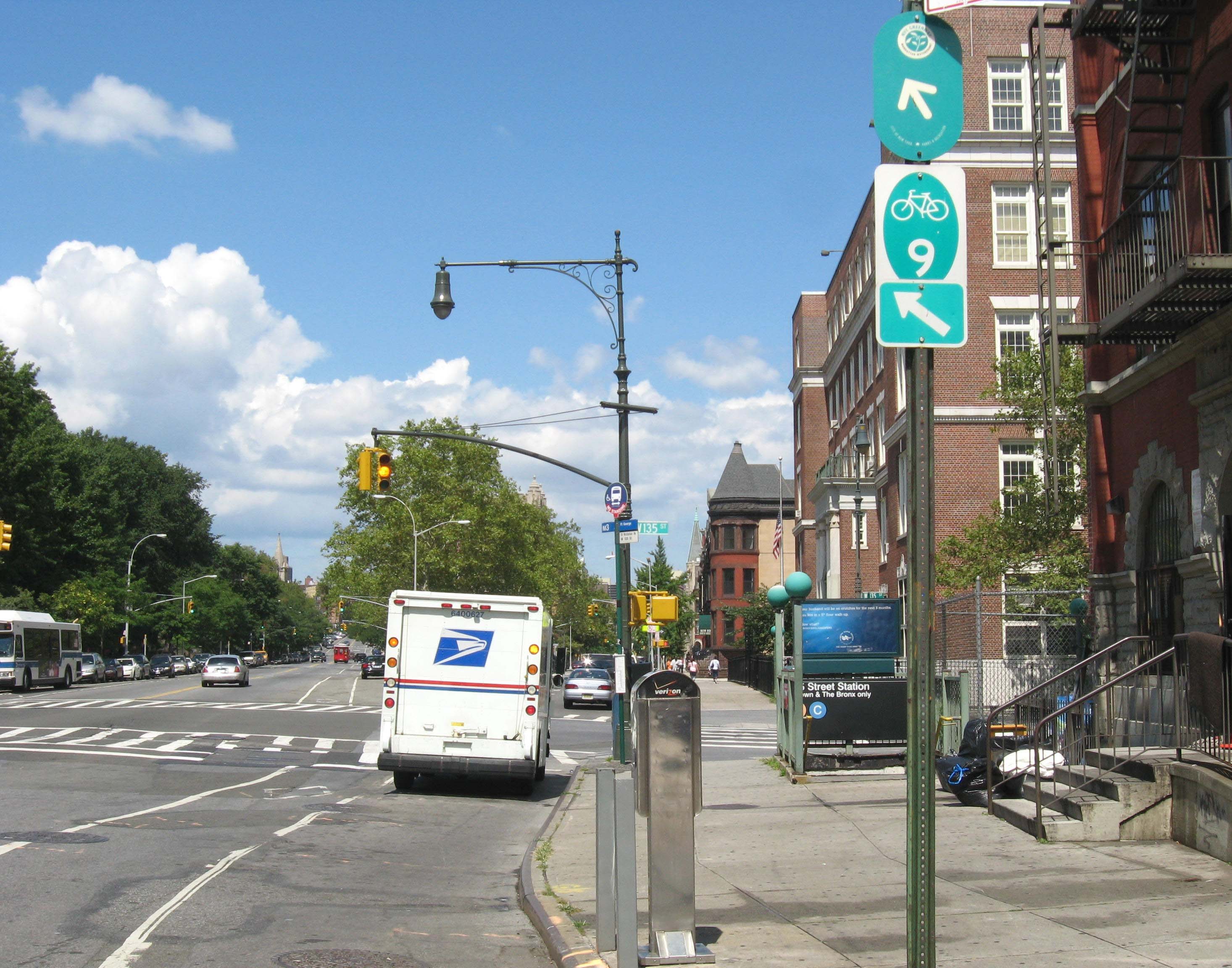
The avenue, which is also NY State Bike Route 9

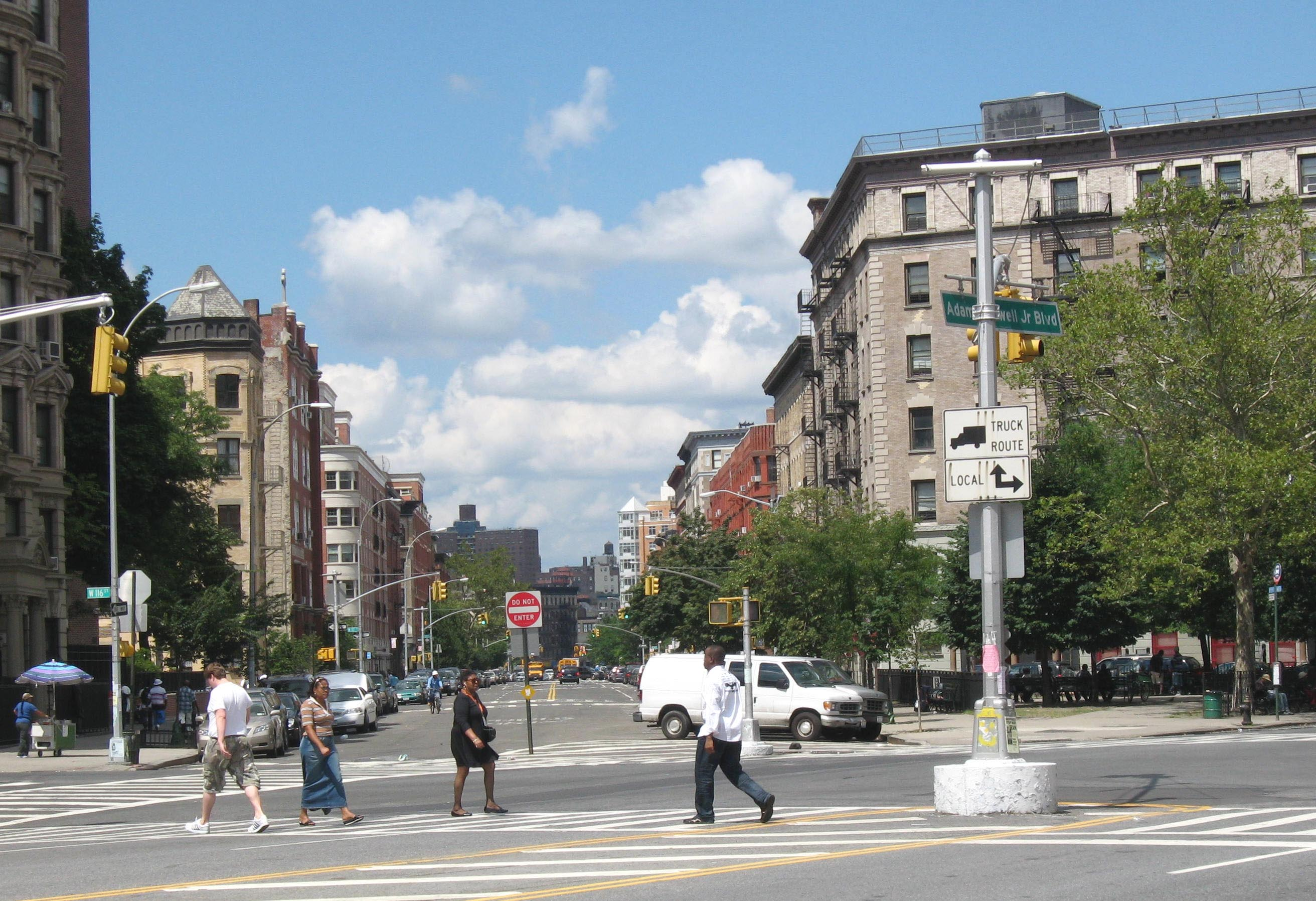
Looking north at 116th Street

St. Nicholas Avenue is a major street that runs obliquely north-south through several blocks between 111th and 193rd Streets in the New York City borough of Manhattan. St. Nicholas Avenue serves as a border between the West Side of Harlem and Central Harlem. The route, which follows a course that is much older than the grid pattern of the Commissioners' Plan of 1811, passes through the neighborhoods of Harlem, Hamilton Heights, and Washington Heights. It is believed to follow the course of an old Indian trail that became an important road in the 17th century between the Dutch settlement of New Amsterdam and the British New England Colonies. In the post colonial era, it became the western end of the Boston Post Road. The road became a street when row housing was being built in Harlem during its rapid urban expansion following the end of the American Civil War.

== Route ==
North of 169th Street, St. Nicholas Avenue is aligned with the street grid with Wadsworth Avenue one block west (north of 174th Street) and Audubon Avenue one block east. It crosses over the Trans-Manhattan Expressway at 178-179th Streets. The intersection of St. Nicholas with Broadway at 167th Street forms Mitchell Square Park. Below 169th Street, St. Nicholas Avenue cuts at a diagonal to much of the Manhattan street grid, crossing Amsterdam Avenue at 162nd Street and continuing against the grain to West 148th Street. Below 148th, St. Nicholas returns to a rough alignment with the grid, with Convent Avenue one block west and Edgecombe Avenue to the east, down to 124th Street. Below 124th, St. Nicholas Avenue takes a sharp diagonal, crossing Frederick Douglass Boulevard at 121st Street, and Adam Clayton Powell Jr. Boulevard at 116th Street, ending at Lenox Avenue, just north of Central Park. Its 17th-century origin as part of the Eastern Post Road accounts for its non-conformance to the grid pattern proposed by the Commissioners' Plan of 1811.

== Transportation ==
The IND Eighth Avenue Line (A, B, C, and D trains) runs under St. Nicholas Avenue north of 121st Street as far as 168th Street, and is sometimes referred to as the St. Nicholas Avenue Line. The IRT Broadway-Seventh Avenue Line (1 train) also has stations on the avenue at 181st & 191st Streets.

Bus service is provided by the following:

- The M3 serves it north of West 122nd Street uptown or Manhattan Avenue downtown, but is absent between West 155th Street and respectively either West 163rd Street or Amsterdam Avenue in the aforementioned directions. Service north of West 190th Street is downtown only, shared with the M101.
- The segment between Broadway and 163rd/Amsterdam is also served by the M100. Its last downtown stop is on the avenue at West 125th Street.
- The Bx33 loops around the avenue at West 135th Street.

== History ==
The street is claimed to follow an old Wecquaesgeek trail. From early colonial days through the 19th century, it was known as Harlem Lane. Travelers used it for going between New York and northern areas such as Spuyten Duyvil and Kingsbridge. In 2011, the location of one of Old Croton Aqueduct's ventilating towers was discovered on the east side of the avenue.

St. Nicholas Avenue is named after Saint Nicholas of Myra, patron saint of New Amsterdam since Dutch times.

On September 30, 1956, an American pilot named Thomas Fitzpatrick landed a stolen plane near 191st Street in front of a New York City bar where earlier he had been drinking and made an intoxicated barroom bet that he could travel from New Jersey to New York City in 15 minutes.

In 2000, Mayor Rudolph Giuliani signed a bill adding the name "Juan Pablo Duarte Boulevard" to St. Nicholas Avenue for the stretch from Amsterdam Avenue and West 162nd Street to the intersection of West 193rd Street and Fort George Hill. The added name was in honor of Juan Pablo Duarte, one of the founding fathers of the Dominican Republic.
