= Mitchel Square Park =

Public park in Manhattan, New York

Coordinates: 40°50′24.5″N 73°56′24″W

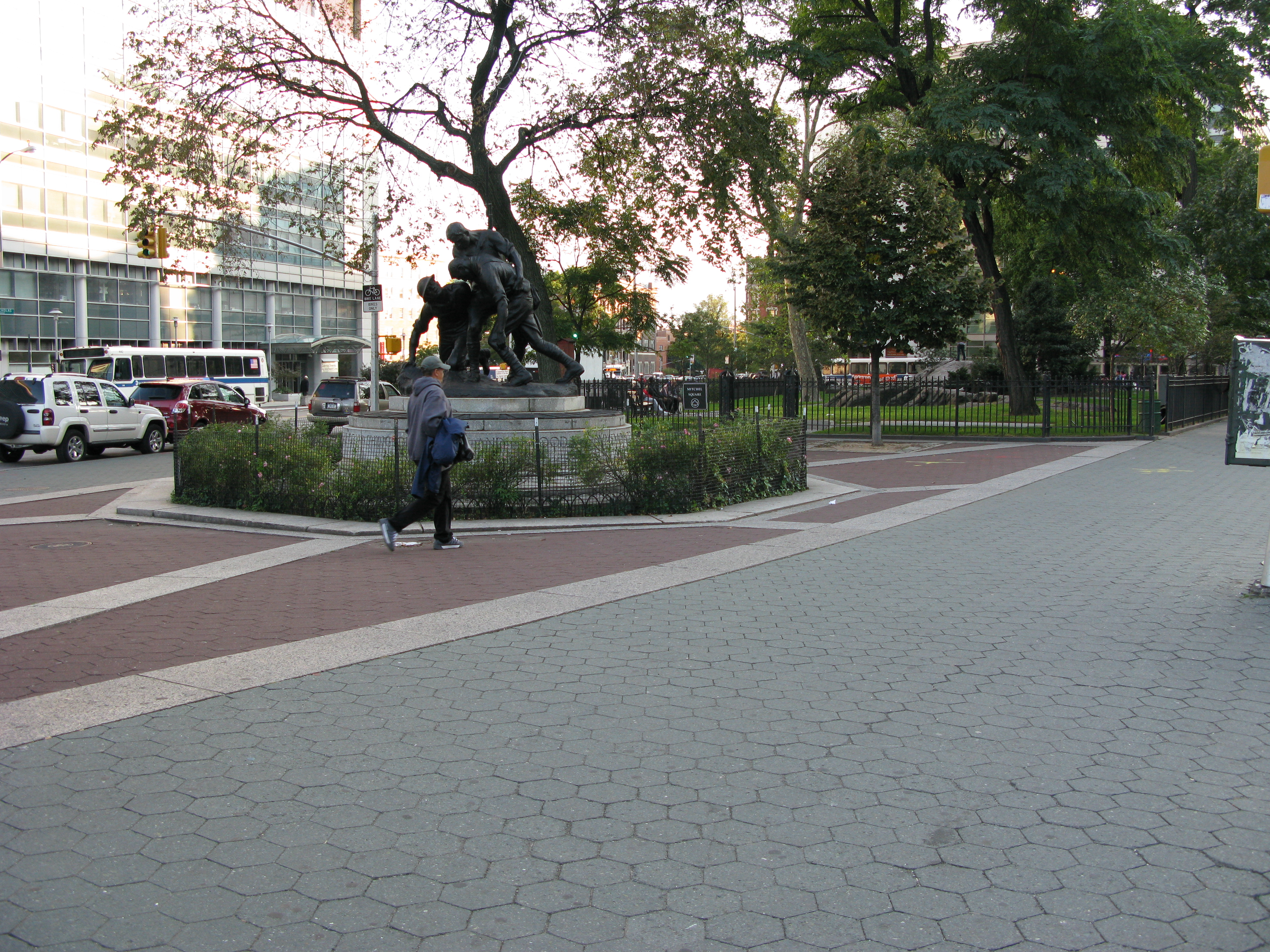
The World War I Memorial in the park.

Mitchel Square Park is a small urban park in the Washington Heights neighborhood of the New York City borough of Manhattan named in honor of former mayor John Purroy Mitchel. It is a two part, triangle-shaped park formed by the intersection of Saint Nicholas Avenue, Broadway and 167th Street.

The southern part of the park, enclosed by an iron fence, is a grassy area with benches and large outcroppings of Manhattan schist.

The northern part features a World War I Memorial in the form of a sculpture by Gertrude Vanderbilt Whitney. There are three bronze figures, a wounded sailor is supported by a Marine, while an army private bends to talk to the wounded man. This monument received a 1923 medal from the New York Society of Architects as "the most meritorious monument erected during the year." The figural group is mounted on a granite pedestal that reads: “Erected by the people of Washington Heights and Inwood in commemoration of the men who gave their lives in the World War.” When it was erected, on Memorial Day, May 1922, there had been only one world war. The sculpture is surrounded by a fence and plantings.

The park was previously named Audubon Square.
