= Adrian Baillie =

British politician (1898–1947)

The Right Honourable Sir Adrian Baillie Bt DL

Member of Parliament
- In office 23 March 1937 – 15 June 1945
- Preceded by: Herbert Spender-Clay
- Succeeded by: Gerald Williams
- Constituency: Tonbridge
- In office 27 October 1931 – 25 October 1935
- Preceded by: Manny Shinwell
- Succeeded by: George Mathers
- Constituency: Linlithgowshire

Personal details
- Born: Adrian William Maxwell Baillie; 5 May 1898
- Died: 8 January 1947 (aged 48)
- Party: Unionist; Conservative
- Spouse: Olive Cecilia Paget (m. 1931; div. 1944)
- Children: Sir Gawaine Baillie, 7th Baronet
- Education: Eton College; Royal Military Academy Sandhurst

Sir Adrian William Maxwell Baillie, 6th Baronet DL (5 May 1898 – 8 January 1947) was a British MP for two constituencies.

== Early life ==
Baillie was born on 5 May 1898. He was the second son of Sir Robert Alexander Baillie, 4th Baronet (1859–1947) and Isabel, Lady Baillie. Upon the death of his elder brother, Sir Gawaine Baillie, 5th Baronet, in 1914 during World War I, he became the 6th Baronet while still at Eton.

His maternal grandfather was David Elliot Wilkie and his paternal grandparents were Thomas Baillie and Elizabeth (née Ballingall) Baillie. His father's older brother, Sir George Baillie, 3rd Baronet (who died unmarried at an early age and was a Justice of the Peace for New South Wales and Victoria), had inherited the baronetcy from his childless uncle, Sir William Baillie, 2nd Baronet, a Conservative Member of Parliament for Linlithgowshire. The first baronet was Sir William Baillie (a son of William Baillie, Lord Polkemmet), who was created the Baillie baronet of Polkemmet in the County of Linlithgow in 1819. Among his extended family was aunts, Elizabeth (née Baillie) Cavendish (wife of William Edwin Cavendish, son of the 2nd Baron Chesham, and sister-in-law of both the 3rd Baron Chesham and 1st Duke of Westminster) and Mary (née Baillie) Price (wife of Thomas Caradoc Rose Price).

Baillie was educated at Eton College and at Royal Military Academy Sandhurst.

== Career ==
Sir Adrian served with the Royal Scots Greys in France in 1918, gaining the rank of Lieutenant. After the war ended, he entered the Diplomatic Service and served as the Second Secretary to the British Embassy at Washington from 1924 to 1928.

=== Political career ===
While back in the United Kingdom on leave during the summer of 1928, Sir Adrian agreed to contest the parliamentary constituency of Linlithgowshire at the request of Victor Hope, 2nd Marquess of Linlithgow. He was defeated by Labour politician Manny Shinwell in 1929, but ran again in 1931 where he was elected as Unionist Party MP for Linlithgowshire, where his family home was situated.

Sir Adrian was defeated in his attempt at reelection in 1935 by George Mathers (who later became the first Baron Mathers). After the death from influenza of Herbert Spender-Clay, he was then elected as Conservative MP for Tonbridge at a by-election in 1937, but stood down in 1945. Sir Adrian, reportedly "devoted himself to his constituents and to campaigning for improved conditions for agricultural workers."

== Personal life ==
On 4 November 1931, at Holy Trinity Church in London, he was married to the former Olive Cecilia Paget (1899–1974), the eldest daughter of Englishman Almeric Paget, 1st Baron Queenborough and his American wife, Pauline Payne (née Whitney) Paget of the prominent Whitney family. Olive, who was educated in France and served briefly as a wartime nurse, had been married, and divorced, twice before. With her first husband, the Hon. Charles John Frederick Winn (son of Baron St Oswald of Nostell Priory), she was the mother of two daughters; Pauline Winn (b. 1920) (Note: Sir Adrian's stepdaughter, Pauline Katharine Winn (1920-1984), was first married to Hon. Edward Frederick Ward (1907–1987), son of William Ward, 2nd Earl of Dudley. They divorced in 1947 and she married Norman Butler (1918–2011) in 1948. In 1958, they also divorced and, in 1960, she married Boyd de Brossard. In 1974 she married edward Lee Cave.) and Susan Winn (1923–2001) (Note: Sir Adrian's stepdaughter, Susan Mary Sheila Winn (1923–2001), was married to Geoffrey Russell, 4th Baron Ampthill (1921–2011), with whom she had one daughter and three sons, including David Russell, 5th Baron Ampthill.) before their divorce in 1925. With her second husband, Arthur Wilson Filmer, whom she married in 1925, she bought Leeds Castle in Kent, which she retained after their divorce in 1931. Together, Adrian and Olive were the parents of one child before their marriage also ended in divorce in 1944:

- Sir Gawaine Baillie, 7th Baronet (1934–2003), who married Lucille Margot Beaubien, the daughter of Senator Louis Beaubien of Montreal, in 1966.

He was a friend of the actor Douglas Fairbanks Sr., and was involved in a car accident in Fairbanks car while en route to Palm Springs, California from Los Angeles in 1939.

Sir Adrian died on 8 January 1947. He was buried at Whitburn South Parish Churchyard at Whitburn at West Lothian, Scotland.

=== Descendants ===
Through his son Gawaine, he was the paternal grandfather of Liza Baillie (b. 1969) and Sir Adrian Baillie, 8th Baronet (b. 1973).

Parliament of the United Kingdom
Preceded by Manny Shinwell	Member of Parliament for Linlithgowshire; 1931 – 1935	Succeeded by George Mathers
Preceded by Herbert Spender-Clay	Member of Parliament for Tonbridge; 1937 – 1945	Succeeded by Gerald Williams
Baronetage of the United Kingdom
Preceded by Gawaine Baillie	Baronet (of Polkemmet); 1914–1947	Succeeded by Gawaine Baillie
