= 1937 Tonbridge by-election =

UK Parliamentary by-election

The 1937 Tonbridge by-election was held on 23 March 1937. The by-election was held due to the death of the incumbent Conservative MP, Herbert Spender-Clay. It was won by the Conservative candidate Adrian Baillie.

== Candidates ==
Adrian Baillie had previously been the Unionist MP for the normally Labour seat of Linlithgowshire from 1931 to 1935.

The Liberal challenger was 59 year-old Borlase Matthews. He was Liberal candidate at Henley for the 1931 general election, the 1932 Henley by-election and at Ashford for the 1935 general election. He was an engineer but left engineering to take up farming. He was a Member of the Council of the Royal Agricultural Society. He was a Member of the Electricity Commissioners Rural Electrification Conference. He was Chairman of the Rural Reconstruction Association. He was also an author of several books and papers on farming.

== Result ==
Tonbridge by-election, 1937
Party	Candidate	Votes	%	±%
Conservative	Adrian Baillie	18,802	56.9	−4.4
Labour	H Smith	8,147	24.7	+0.1
Liberal	Richard Borlase Matthews	6,073	18.4	+4.3
Majority		10,655	32.2	−4.5
Turnout		33,022	58.2	−10.0
Conservative hold		Swing	-2.2	
