= Richard Hornby =

British politician

Member of Parliament for Tonbridge
- In office 7 June 1956 – 8 February 1974
- Preceded by: Gerald Williams

Personal details
- Born: Richard Phipps Hornby; 20 June 1922 Lancashire, England
- Died: 22 September 2007 (aged 85) Wiltshire, England
- Party: Conservative
- Spouse: Stella Hichens (m. 1951)
- Children: 4
- Parent: Hugh Hornby (father)
- Profession: Business

Richard Phipps Hornby (20 June 1922 – 22 September 2007) was a British Conservative politician and businessman. He was Member of Parliament for Tonbridge for over 17½ years, from June 1956 to February 1974, holding a junior ministerial position for a year in the mid-1960s. He worked for the J. Walter Thompson advertising agency before, during, and after his career in Parliament, and was Chairman of the Halifax Building Society from 1983 to 1990.

== Early and private life ==
Hornby was born in St Michael's on Wyre in Lancashire, the eldest son of Hugh Hornby. His father won a Military Cross as a military chaplain in France in 1916, and was Vicar of St Michael's on Wyre when Richard was born, later Rector of Bury and Suffragan Bishop of Hulme.

Hornby was a scholar at Winchester College. He played occasional matches in the Football League for Bury F.C. as a teenager. He studied history at Trinity College, Oxford, winning a Blue for football. His studies were interrupted by five years of service as an officer in the King's Royal Rifle Corps in the Second World War. He landed in France six weeks after D-Day, fighting across France, the Low Countries and into Germany. He was involved in liberating concentration camps.

After completing his studies after the war, he taught history at Eton College from 1948 to 1950. In 1951 he married the professional soprano Stella Hichens, who was the daughter of Lionel Hichens and the granddaughter of Sir Neville Lyttelton. They had three sons and one daughter. He spent a year as a marketing trainee with Unilever from 1951 to 1952, and then moved to the J. Walter Thompson advertising agency as a copywriter, before concentrating on a political career.

== Political career ==
He fought (and lost) as Conservative candidate for Walthamstow West in the 1955 general election, losing to the incumbent, leader of the Labour Party and former prime minister Clement Attlee. He also contested, and lost, the by-election in March 1956 after Attlee moved to the House of Lords as Earl Attlee. Hornby was finally elected Member of Parliament at the by-election in June 1956 for the safe Conservative seat of Tonbridge, although, against a local Labour politician and with the unpopular government of Anthony Eden, the Conservative majority was cut to barely 1,600 votes.

He was Parliamentary Private Secretary to Duncan Sandys from 1959 to 1963, and continued to work for J Walter Thompson. He took leave of absence from his advertising job from October 1963 until the October 1964 general election, to serve as Parliamentary Under-Secretary of State for the Colonies, with responsibility for Africa and Commonwealth education, his only position in the government. He also served on the General Advisory Council of the BBC from 1969 to 1974, and was a member of the Committee of Enquiry into Intrusions into Privacy from 1970 to 1972, and was a member of the British Council and the Institute of Race Relations.

His liberal views led to trouble in his constituency—he supported sanctions against Ian Smith's regime in Rhodesia, and supported the abolition of capital punishment. A true "wet", he served until the constituency was abolished in boundary changes at the February 1974 general election. Declining the opportunity to stand in the new safe seat of Royal Tunbridge Wells, he returned full-time to J. Walter Thompson, becoming a director.

== Later life ==
He joined the London board of the Halifax Building Society in 1974, and joined its main board of directors in 1976. He was its vice-chairman from 1981 to 1983, and its chairman from 1983 until he retired in 1990, during a period which saw rapid expansion, the ending of interest rates being set by the Building Societies Association, and the enactment of the Building Societies Act 1987. He was also a director of Cadbury Schweppes, McCorquodale and Business in the Community.

He enjoyed outdoor activities—hill-walking, fishing, shooting and bird-watching. He died in Bowerchalke in Wiltshire. One son predeceased him. He was survived by his wife and three of their children.

== See also ==
- Politics of the United Kingdom

== Notes ==
Parliament of the United Kingdom
Preceded by Gerald Wellington Williams	Member of Parliament for Tonbridge; 1956–1974	Constituency abolished
Political offices
Preceded by Nigel Fisher	Under-Secretary of State for the Colonies; 1963–1964; With: Nigel Fisher	Succeeded by Eirene White; Lord Taylor
