= Almeric Paget Massage Corps =

The Almeric Paget Massage Corps (later the Almeric Paget Military Massage Corps) was a British physiotherapy service during the First World War.

== History ==
On the outbreak of the First World War, Almeric Paget and his first wife, the American socialite Pauline Payne Whitney, offered the services of 50 trained masseuses to the British War Office. The offer was accepted and by November 1914, 50 women had been placed in military hospitals. At this time the demand for physiotherapy (or Massage and Electrical Treatment as it was known) increased and the Pagets were asked to open a day centre in London to relieve pressure on the military hospitals in London. Lady Alexander Paget offered her house at 55 Portland Place and soon over 200 men were being seen at the clinic seen every day. By now the number of women employed in the corps was over 200 and soon they became attached to the staff of most military hospitals with a further 120 masseuses employed.

In 1916 the work of the Corps was favourably inspected by Alfred Keogh, the Director General of the Army Medical Service. This inspection had two direct outcomes. Firstly the name of the Corps was amended to become the Almeric Paget Military Massage Corps and, secondly, the Corps was asked to manage physiotherapy services in all military hospitals and convalescent camps. As part of the second the services provided would be paid for by a government grant, until then the Corps and the services it provided had been privately funded by the Pagets and by donations.

Until 1917 all Corps members were UK based but from January 1917 onwards members could volunteer to work overseas and by the end of the war 56 members of the Corps had or were working abroad in Italy and France.

By the end of the war over 2,000 masseuses and masseurs were at work and just under 3,400 had been engaged by the Corps at some point during the war.

The Corps came to an end in January 1919 when a formal Military Massage Service was formed under the auspices of the Army and Pensions Massage Association. All members of the Corps were given the option to join the new Service which was controlled jointly by the War Office and the Ministry of Pensions.
