= Olive, Lady Baillie =

Anglo-American heiress and hostess (1899–1974)

The Honourable Olive, Lady Baillie
- Olive, Lady Baillie with her daughters Susan and Pauline, painted by Drian, 1947
- Born: Olive Cecilia Paget; 24 September 1899; Manhattan, New York City, U.S.
- Died: 9 September 1974 (aged 74); London, England
- Spouses: Charles John Frederick Winn (m. 1919; div. 1925) Arthur Wilson Filmer (m. 1925; div. 1930) Sir Adrian Baillie, Bt. (m. 1931; div. 1944)
- Children: 3, including Gawaine Baillie
- Parent(s): Almeric Paget, 1st Baron Queenborough; Pauline Payne Whitney
- Relatives: Dorothy Paget (sister); David Russell (grandson); William C. Whitney (grandfather); Lord Alfred Paget (grandfather)

Olive, Lady Baillie (24 September 1899 – 9 September 1974), was an Anglo-American heiress, landowner and hostess. She is best known as the owner of Leeds Castle, near Maidstone, Kent, England. On her death the castle was bequeathed to a charitable trust to enable it to be open to the public.

== Early life ==
Olive Cecilia Paget was born in Manhattan in the United States on 24 September 1899. She was the elder daughter of the Englishman Almeric Paget (1861–1949), a member of parliament for Cambridge who later became the 1st Baron Queenborough, and the American heiress Pauline Payne Whitney (1874–1916), who married in 1895. Her younger sister, Dorothy Wyndham Paget, was born in 1905. Before her parents' marriage, her father had lived in the United States for many years, "engaging in ranch life and farming in the Northwest, and afterward lived in New York."

Her maternal grandparents were Flora (née Payne) Whitney and William Collins Whitney, the United States Secretary of the Navy under President Grover Cleveland. Among her mother's side of the family was uncle Harry Payne Whitney (who married Gertrude Vanderbilt); uncle Payne Whitney (who married Helen Hay); and aunt Dorothy Payne Whitney (who married twice, first to investment banker Willard Dickerman Straight and, after his death, to Englishman Leonard Knight Elmhirst). Her paternal grandparents were Cecilia (née Wyndham) Paget and Lord Alfred Paget, the fifth son of Henry Paget, 1st Marquess of Anglesey, who commanded the British cavalry at the Battle of Waterloo. Among her father's side of the family was Arthur Paget; Sydney Paget; and Alexandra Paget (wife of Edward Colebrooke, 1st Baron Colebrooke).

When their mother died in 1916, Olive and her sister Dorothy inherited $4,000,000 to be divided between the girls. Both girls were already legatees under the will of their mother's uncle, Col. Oliver Hazard Payne, an early Standard Oil investor who never married. After their mother's death, her father remarried in 1921 to conspiracy theorist and anti-Mormon agitator Edith Starr Miller, a daughter of the American real estate investor William Starr Miller. Through her father's second marriage, which ended in divorce in 1932, she had three younger half-sisters, Audrey Elizabeth Paget, an aviator; Enid Louise Paget; and Cicilie Carol Paget.

Olive was educated in France and, in 1918, during World War I, she served briefly as a wartime nurse.

== Personal life ==
On 21 July 1919, Lady Olive was married to the Hon. Charles John Frederick Winn (1896–1968), son of Rowland Winn, 2nd Baron St Oswald, of Nostell Priory in Yorkshire. Before their separation in 1924 and divorce in 1925 (he later married Katherine van Heukelom and Theodora Thorpe), they were the parents of two daughters:

- Pauline Katharine Winn (1920–1984), who married Hon. Edward Frederick Ward (1907–1987), son of William Ward, 2nd Earl of Dudley. They divorced in 1947 and, in 1948, she married Norman Butler (1918–2011). They divorced in 1958, and, in 1960, she married Boyd de Brossard. In 1974 she married Edward Lee Cave.
- Susan Mary Sheila Winn (1923–2001), who married to Geoffrey Russell, 4th Baron Ampthill (1921–2011).

In May 1925, she married Arthur Wilson-Filmer (1895–1968), the son of MP Stanley Wilson and Alice Cecil Agnes (née Filmer), and grandson of shipping magnate Arthur Wilson and Sir Edmund Filmer, 9th Baronet. The Wilson-Filmers bought Leeds Castle in 1926–27 but were divorced in December 1930, after which Olive retained possession of the castle.

On 4 November 1931, she married Sir Adrian Baillie, 6th Baronet, thus gaining the title of Lady Baillie. Together, they had one son:

- Gawaine George Hope Baillie (1934–2003), who married Lucille Margot Beaubien, the daughter of Senator Louis Beaubien of Montreal, in 1966.

Sir Adrian and Lady Baillie divorced in 1944; he died in 1947 at which point her son became the 7th Baronet. Lady Baillie died in London on 9 September 1974, fifteen days before her 75th birthday. Her estate amounted to about £4.08 million.

=== Leeds Castle ===
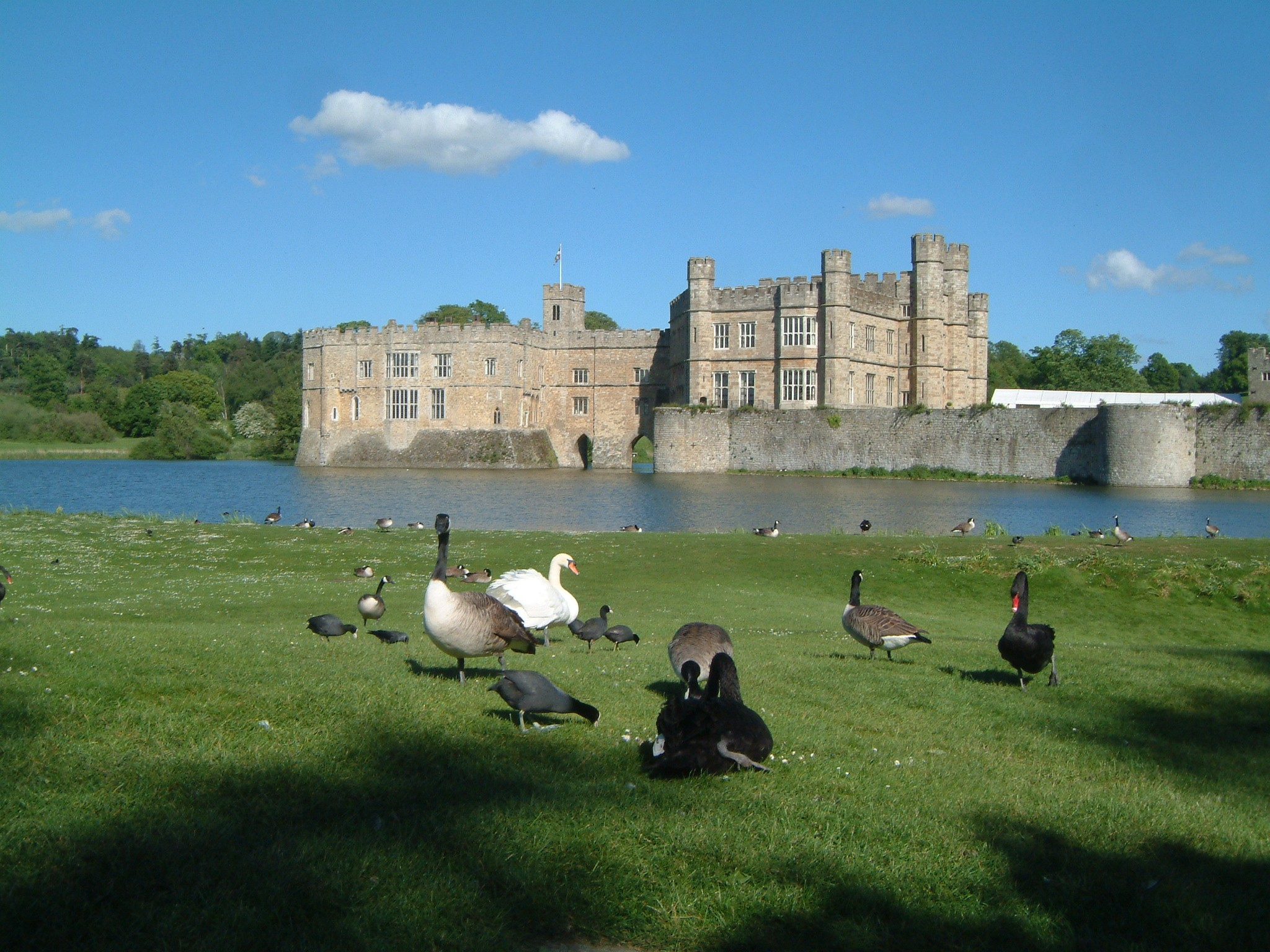
Leeds Castle

When the Wilson Filmers bought Leeds Castle it was in poor condition, having not been lived in since 1924, and parts of the grounds were overgrown. For the remainder of her life, the future Lady Baillie spent a large portion of her inherited fortune on the restoration of the castle and its associated buildings, and on the park and estate. She initially employed Owen Little, a Surrey architect, to carry out work on the entrance lodges and the stable yard. Much of the internal restoration of the castle at that time was designed by the French designer Armand-Albert Rateau. The work was carried out by craftsmen from France and Italy, as well as from Britain. Later, between 1936 and 1967, Lady Baillie worked with the French designer Stéphane Boudin in planning further restorations and improvements to the castle.

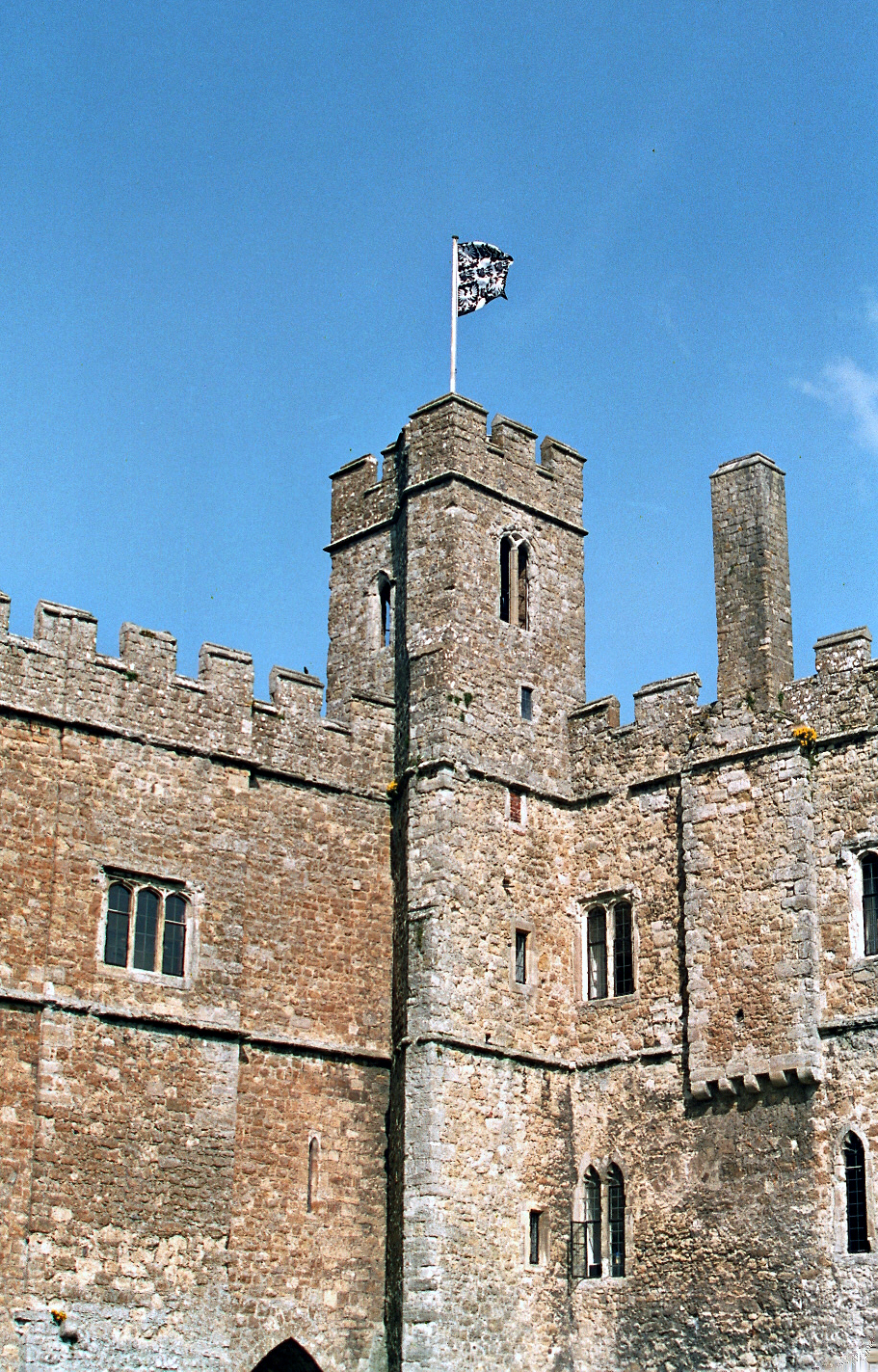
The flag of the Paget family flying at Leeds Castle in remembrance

Lady Baillie became renowned as a hostess. The Baillies lived during the week in London and held house parties at Leeds Castle at the weekends. Frequent visitors to the castle were political friends of Sir Adrian, David Margesson and Geoffrey Lloyd who were to become lifelong friends of Lady Baillie. During the 1930s members of royalty, including the Prince of Wales with Mrs Simpson, the Duke of York, Princess Marina, Queen Maria of Romania, Alfonso XIII of Spain and the Grand Duke Dmitri Pavlovich of Russia were visitors. Other prominent visitors included Sir Alfred Beit, many MPs, including Anthony Eden, and Germany's ambassador to Britain, Joachim von Ribbentrop. Lady Baillie was a lover of the cinema and her guest list during that decade included the film stars Douglas Fairbanks senior and junior, Fredric March, Charlie Chaplin, Errol Flynn, Lili Damita, Robert Taylor, James Stewart and Gertrude Lawrence. Other guests were Margaret, Duchess of Argyll, Barbara Hutton, the author Ian Fleming, and the singer Richard Tauber and his wife Diana Napier.

During the Second World War, Leeds Castle was used as a hospital. After the war, hospitality for prominent guests resumed, but on a smaller scale than in the 1930s. David Margesson and Geoffrey Lloyd continued to visit frequently. Members of the royal family continued to be invited, including Queen Elizabeth the Queen Mother and Princess Marina. Another frequent visitor was Lady Baillie's cousin, John Hay Whitney, the U.S. Ambassador to Great Britain. From the 1950s Lady Baillie's health started to deteriorate. She had always been a cigarette smoker and by the 1970s had become dependent on oxygen and needed the support of a resident nurse. She had given 3,400 acres (14 km^{2}) of the castle's estate to her son Gawaine in 1966, but wanted the castle itself to be available after her death to the public for the arts and conferences. Not wanting it to be taken over by the National Trust, she made arrangements for it to be administered by a charitable trust, which is now the Leeds Castle Foundation.
