= 1956 Tonbridge by-election =

UK Parliamentary by-election

The 1956 Tonbridge by-election was held on 7 June 1956 due to the resignation of the Conservative Member of Parliament, Gerald Williams. It was retained by the Conservative candidate Richard Hornby. Although Tonbridge was usually a safe Conservative seat, this election was fought with a local Labour politician and against the backdrop of Anthony Eden's unpopular government, so the Conservative majority was cut to barely 1,600 votes.

Tonbridge by-election, 1956 Electorate
| Party | Candidate | Votes | % | ±% |
|---|---|---|---|---|
| Conservative | Richard Hornby | 20,515 | 52.0 | −8.4 |
| Labour | Robert L Fagg | 18,913 | 48.0 | +8.4 |
| Majority | | 1,602 | 4.0 | −16.8 |
| Turnout | | 39,428 | | |
| Conservative hold | | Swing | | |
