= Gerald Williams (politician) =

British Conservative politician

Lieutenant-Commander Gerald Wellington Williams JP (1903–1989) was a British Conservative politician. He was elected as a member of parliament (MP) for Tonbridge at the 1945 general election, and was re-elected at the next three elections. He resigned his seat in 1956 through appointment as Steward of the Chiltern Hundreds. He served as a justice of the peace in 1957, and was made High Sheriff of Kent in 1968.

Parliament of the United Kingdom
Preceded by Sir Adrian Baillie, Bt	Member of Parliament for Tonbridge; 1945–1956	Succeeded by Richard Hornby
Honorary titles
Preceded by Unknown	High Sheriff of Kent; 1968	Succeeded by Unknown
