= Leeds Castle =

Castle in Kent, England

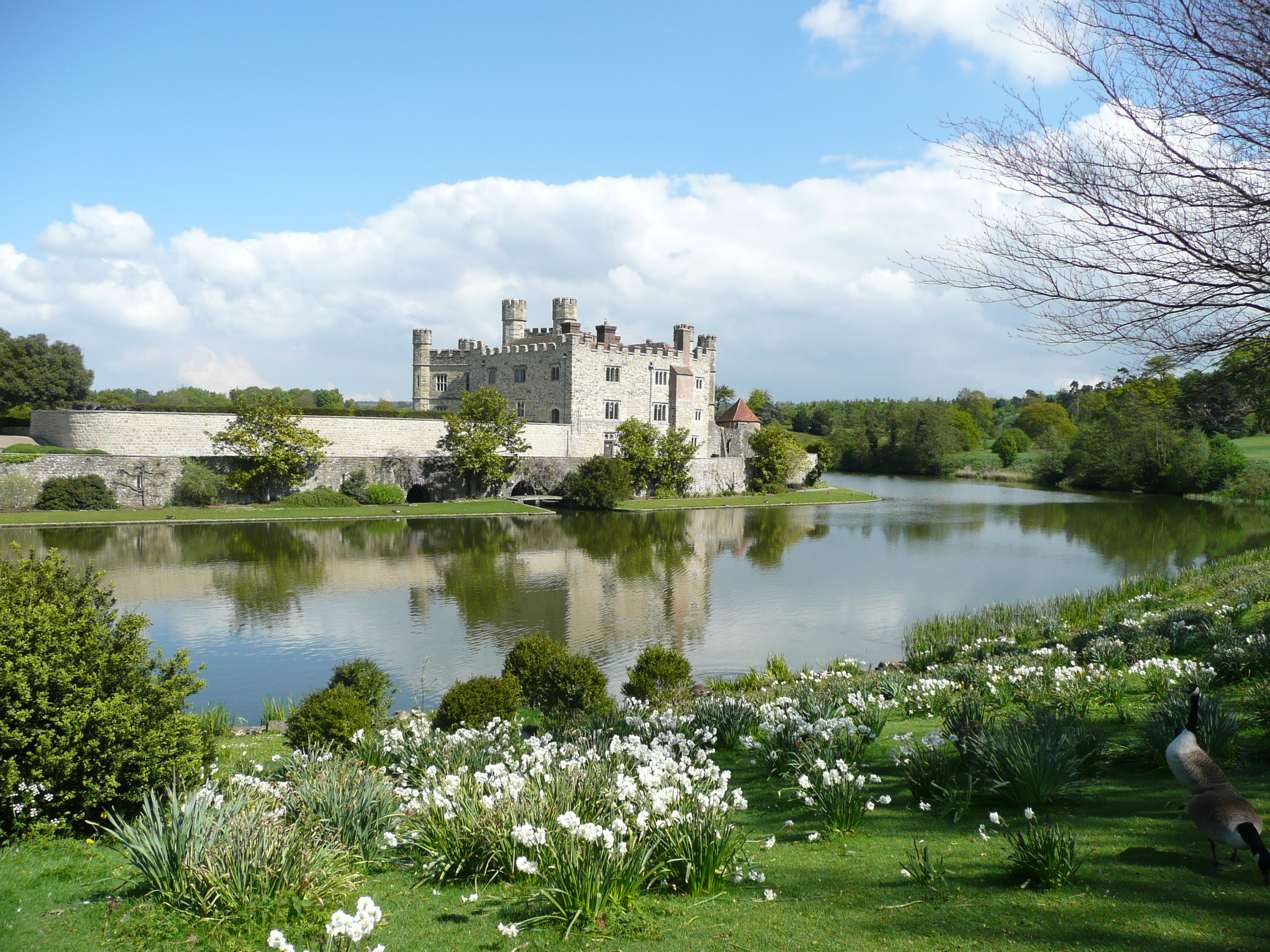
- Leeds Castle

General information
- Architectural style: Castle
- Location: Broomfield, Maidstone, Kent, ME17 1PL, UK
- Coordinates: 51°14′56″N 0°37′48″E
- Construction started: 857
- Renovated: 1278
- Owner: Leeds Castle Foundation

Technical details
- Grounds: Built on islands in a lake formed by the River Len

Website
- https://www.leeds-castle.com

Leeds Castle is a castle in Kent, England, 7 miles (11 km) southeast of Maidstone. It is built on islands in a lake formed by the River Len to the east of the village of Leeds and is a historic Grade I listed estate.

A castle has existed on the site since 857. In the 13th century, it came into the hands of King Edward I, for whom it became a favourite residence; in the 16th century, Henry VIII used it as a dwelling for his first wife, Catherine of Aragon.

The present castle dates mostly from the early 19th century. Its last private owner, Olive, Lady Baillie, left the castle in trust to open it to the public. It has been open since 1976.

== History ==
=== Medieval and Tudor ===
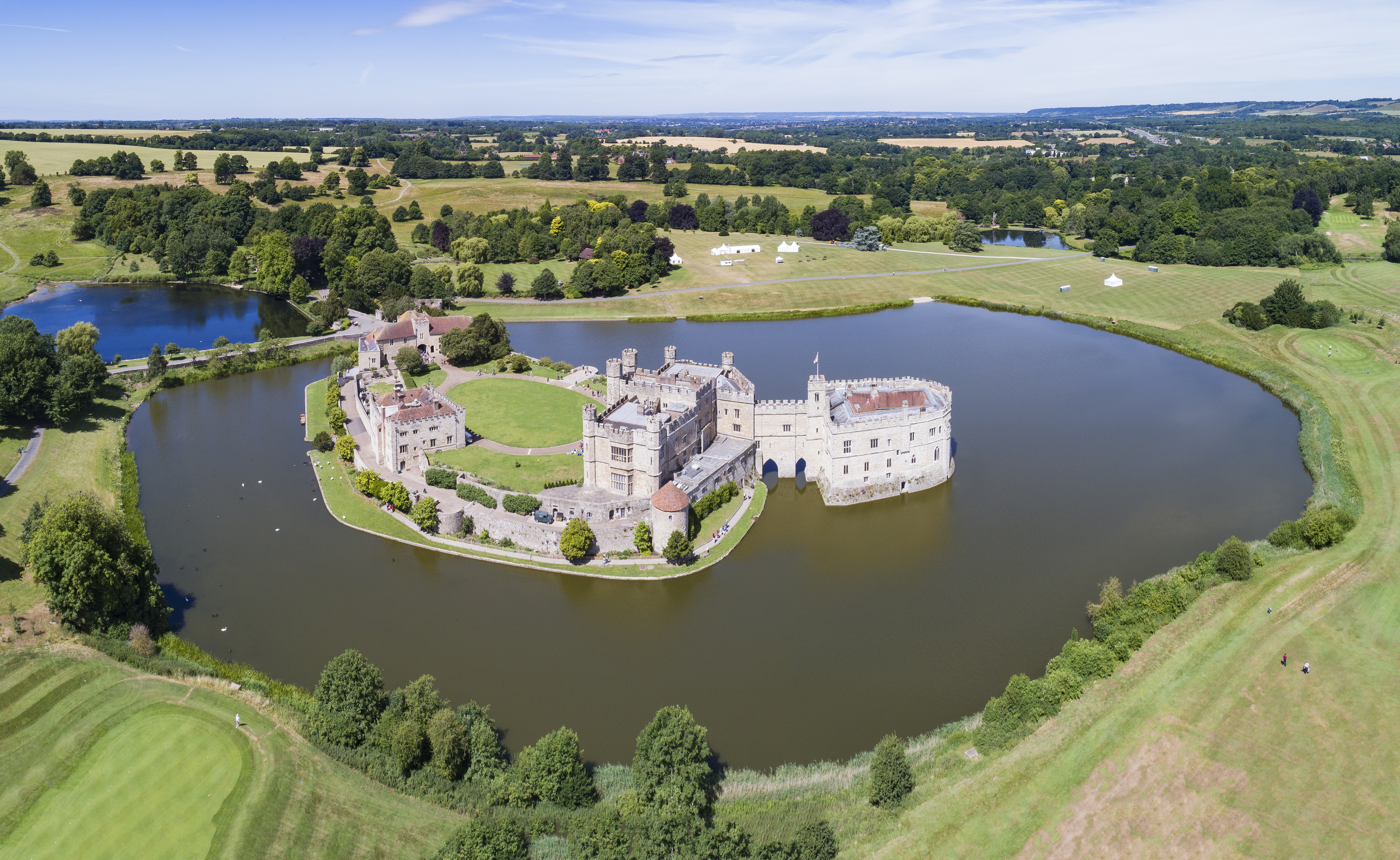
An aerial panorama of Leeds Castle

From 857, the site was owned by a Saxon chief called Led or Leed who built a wooden structure on two islands in the middle of the River Len. In 1119, Robert de Crevecoeur rebuilt it in stone as a Norman stronghold and Leeds Castle descended through the de Crevecoeur family until the 1260s. What form this Norman stronghold took is uncertain because it was rebuilt and transformed in the following centuries. Adrian Pettifer speculates that it may have been a motte and bailey.

In 1278, the castle was bought by King Edward I's Queen, Eleanor of Castile, through the purchase of the debt bond from Jewish moneylenders forced to sell at a considerable discount as a result of Edward's own excessive tax demands. As a favoured residence of Edward's, it saw considerable investment. The king enhanced its defences, and it was probably Edward who created the lake that surrounds the castle. A barbican spanning three islands was also built and a gloriette with apartments for the king and queen was added. In the Late Middle Ages, the growth of the royal household meant fewer residences could accommodate the monarchy when they visited. As a result, expenditure on royal residences in south east England generally decreased except for the Tower of London and Windsor Castle. The activity at Leeds Castle during the reign of Edward I was a notable exception to this pattern.

The castle was captured on 31 October 1321 by the forces of Edward II from Margaret de Clare, Baroness Badlesmere, wife of the castle's constable, Bartholomew de Badlesmere, 1st Baron Badlesmere, who had left her in charge during his absence. The King had besieged Leeds after she had refused Edward's consort Isabella of France admittance in her husband's absence; when the latter sought to force an entry, Lady Badlesmere instructed her archers to shoot at Isabella and her party, six of whom were killed. Lady Badlesmere was kept prisoner in the Tower of London until November 1322. After Edward II died in 1327 his widow took over Leeds Castle as her primary residence.

Richard II's first wife, Anne of Bohemia, spent the winter of 1381 at the castle on her way to be married to the king. In 1395, Richard received the French chronicler Jean Froissart there, as described in Froissart's Chronicles.

Henry VIII transformed the castle in 1519 for his first wife, Catherine of Aragon. A painting commemorating his meeting with Francis I of France still hangs there. The glazier Galyon Hone reworked and restored the chapel windows in 1536. In 1544, Hone returned to repair windows in the lodgings and a banqueting house in the garden for a visit by Catherine Parr.

In 1552 Leeds Castle was granted to Sir Anthony St Leger (d.1559) of Ulcombe, Kent, whose grandfather Ralph I St Leger (d.1470), of Ulcombe, Sheriff of Kent in 1467/8, had been Constable of Leeds Castle.

=== 17th and 18th centuries ===
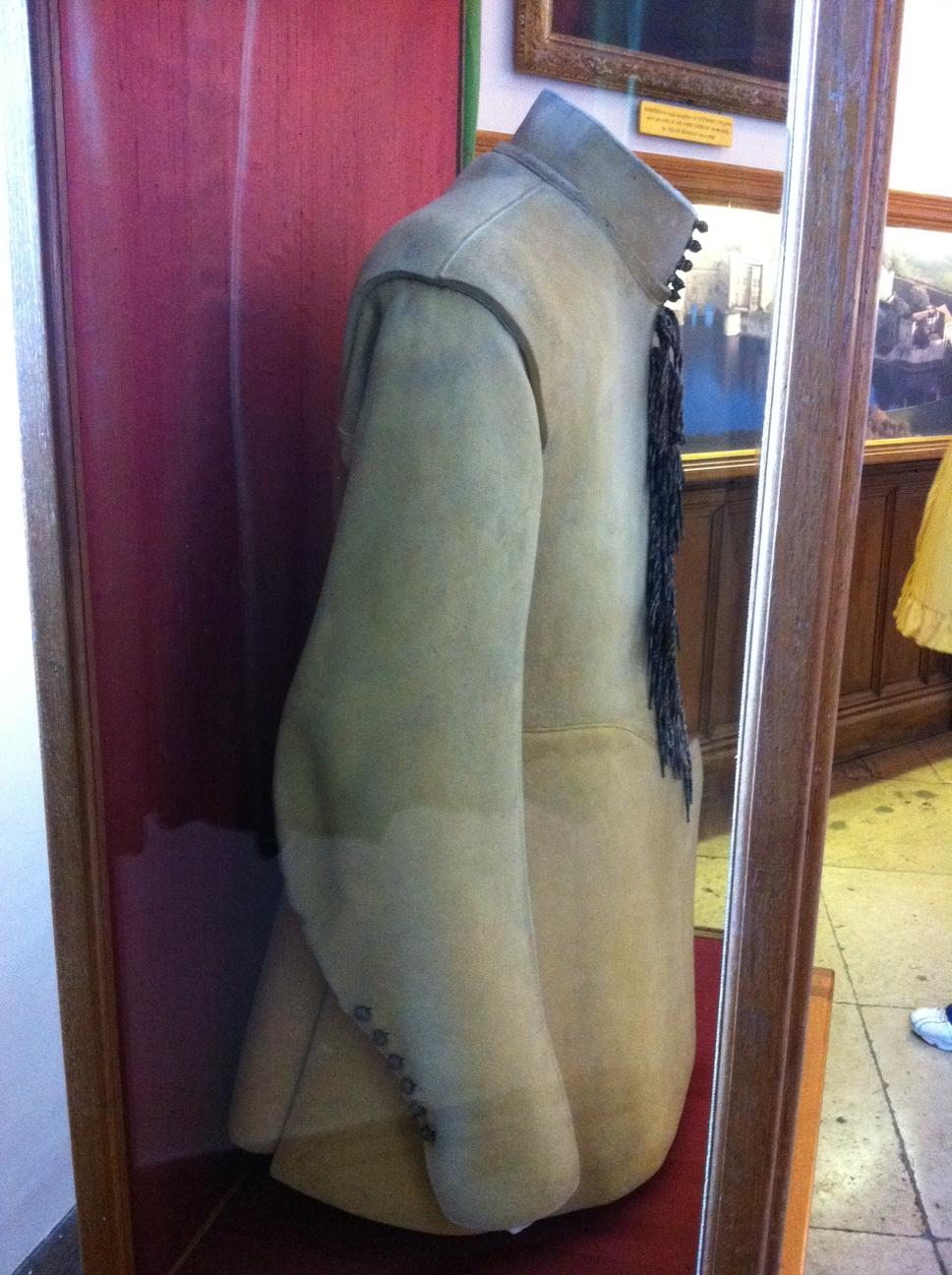
Doublet worn by Fairfax at the Battle of Maidstone in 1648

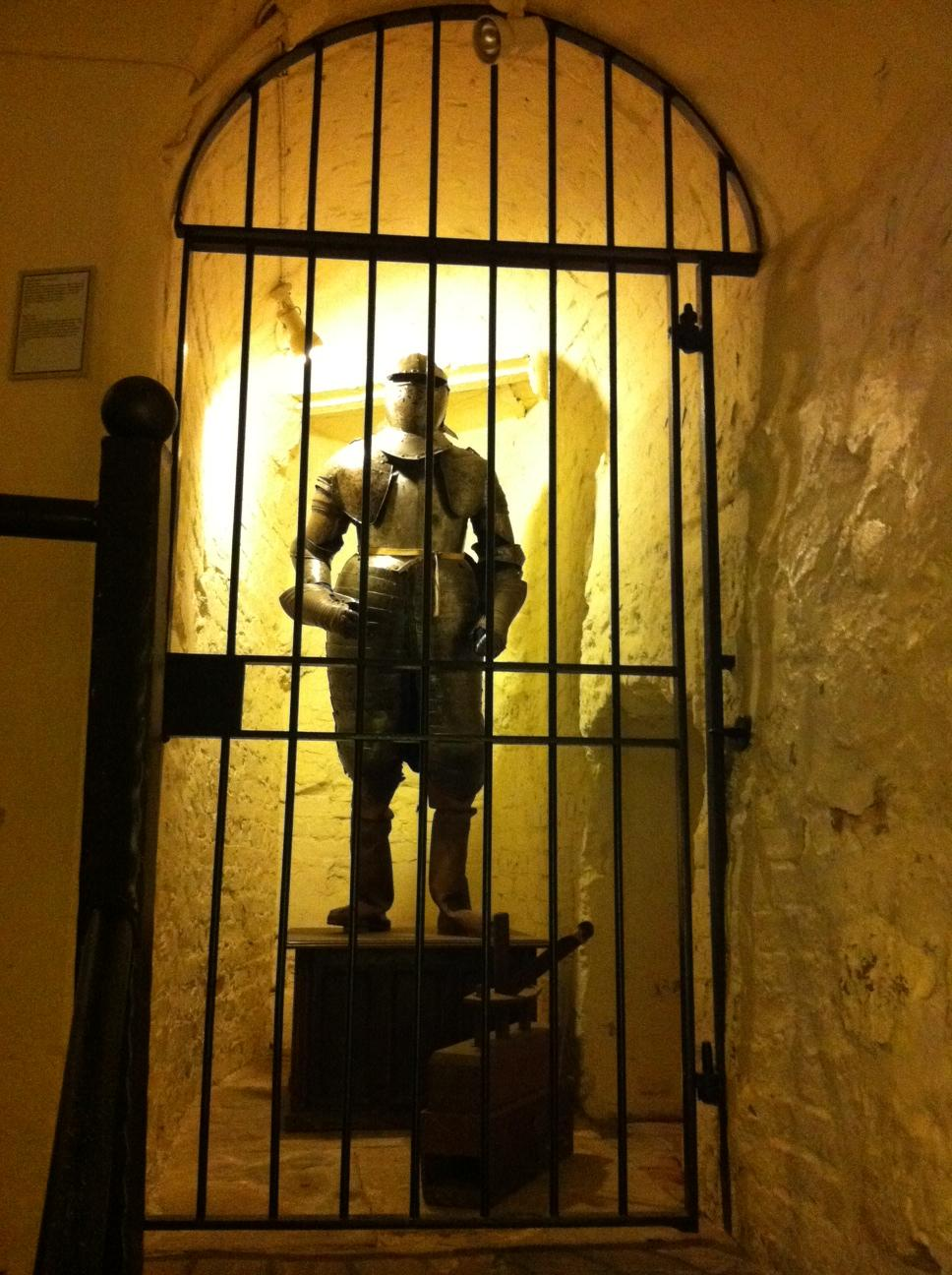
Civil War cuirassier armour at Leeds c. 1640

The St Leger family continued to own the castle until Sir Warham St Leger sold it to Sir Richard Smythe in 1618. Smythe's daughters sold the castle to Sir Thomas Colepeper of Hollingbourne. An early embroidered silk quilt from Bengal dating from the 1620s, held by the Colonial Williamsburg museum, has an ownership label of Catherine Colepeper, connecting it to Leeds Castle and the Smythe and Colepeper families. Richard Smythe's brother Thomas Smythe was a founder and governor of the English East India Company.

The castle escaped destruction during the English Civil War because its owner, Sir Cheney Culpeper, sided with the Parliamentarians. The castle was used as both an arsenal and a prison during the war. Other members of the Culpeper family had sided with the Royalists, John Colepeper, 1st Baron Colepeper, having been granted more than 5,000,000 acres (20,000 km^{2}) of land in Virginia in reward for assisting the escape of the king's son, Charles, the Prince of Wales. This legacy was to prove vital for the castle's fortunes.

Thomas Fairfax, 6th Lord Fairfax of Cameron, was born at the castle in 1693 and settled in North America to oversee the Culpeper estates, cementing an ongoing connection between the castle and America. There is a commemorative sundial at the castle telling the time in Belvoir, Virginia and a corresponding sundial in America. Fairfax was the great-grandson of Thomas Fairfax who led the parliamentarian attack at the nearby Battle of Maidstone in 1648 and whose doublet worn during the battle is on display.

=== 19th century ===
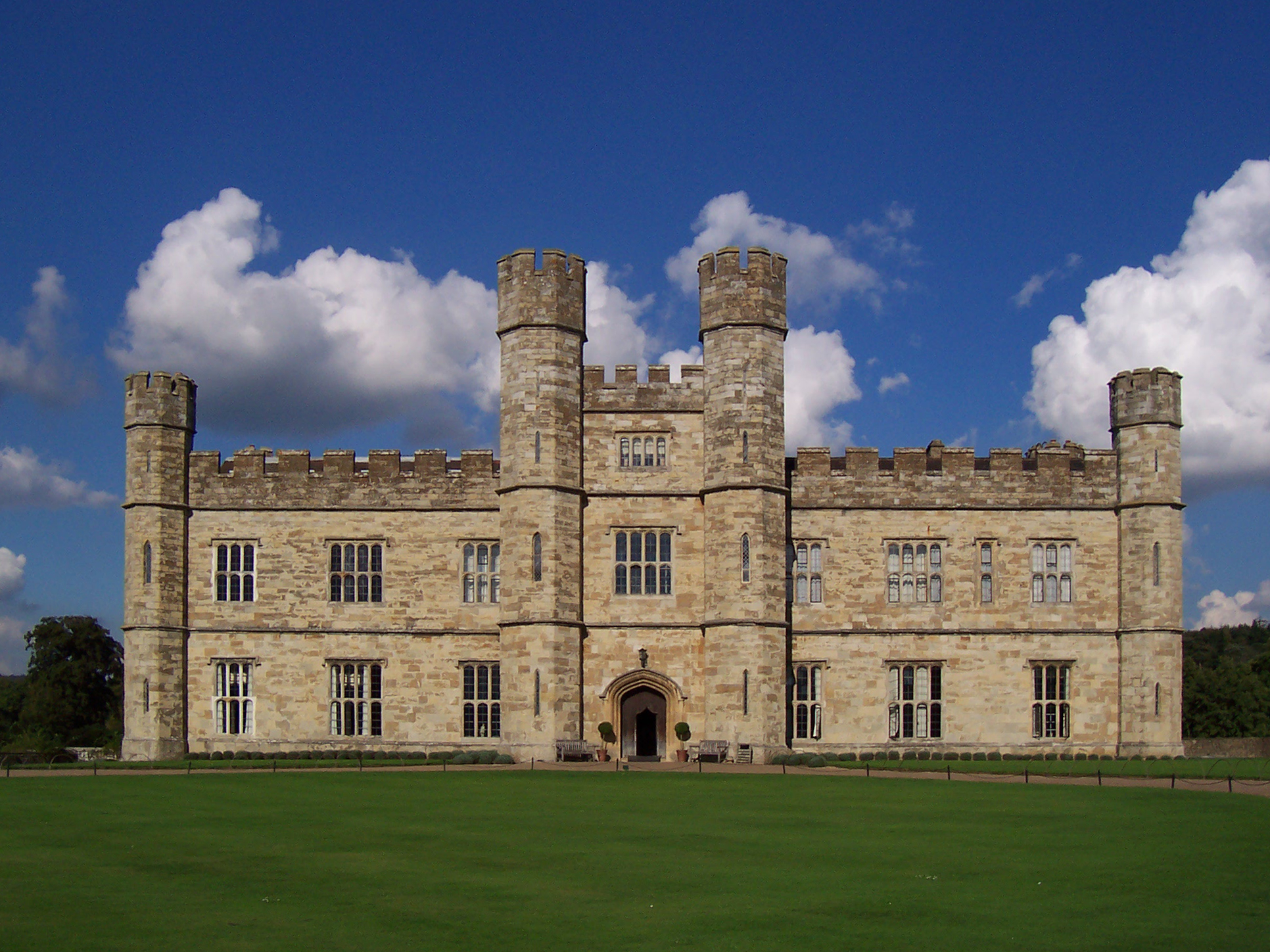
The new castle was completed in 1823 in the Tudor style

Robert Fairfax owned the castle for 46 years until 1793 when it passed to the Wykeham Martins. Sale of the family estates in Virginia released a large sum of money that allowed extensive repair and the remodelling of the castle in a Tudor style, completed in 1823, that resulted in the appearance today.

=== 20th century ===
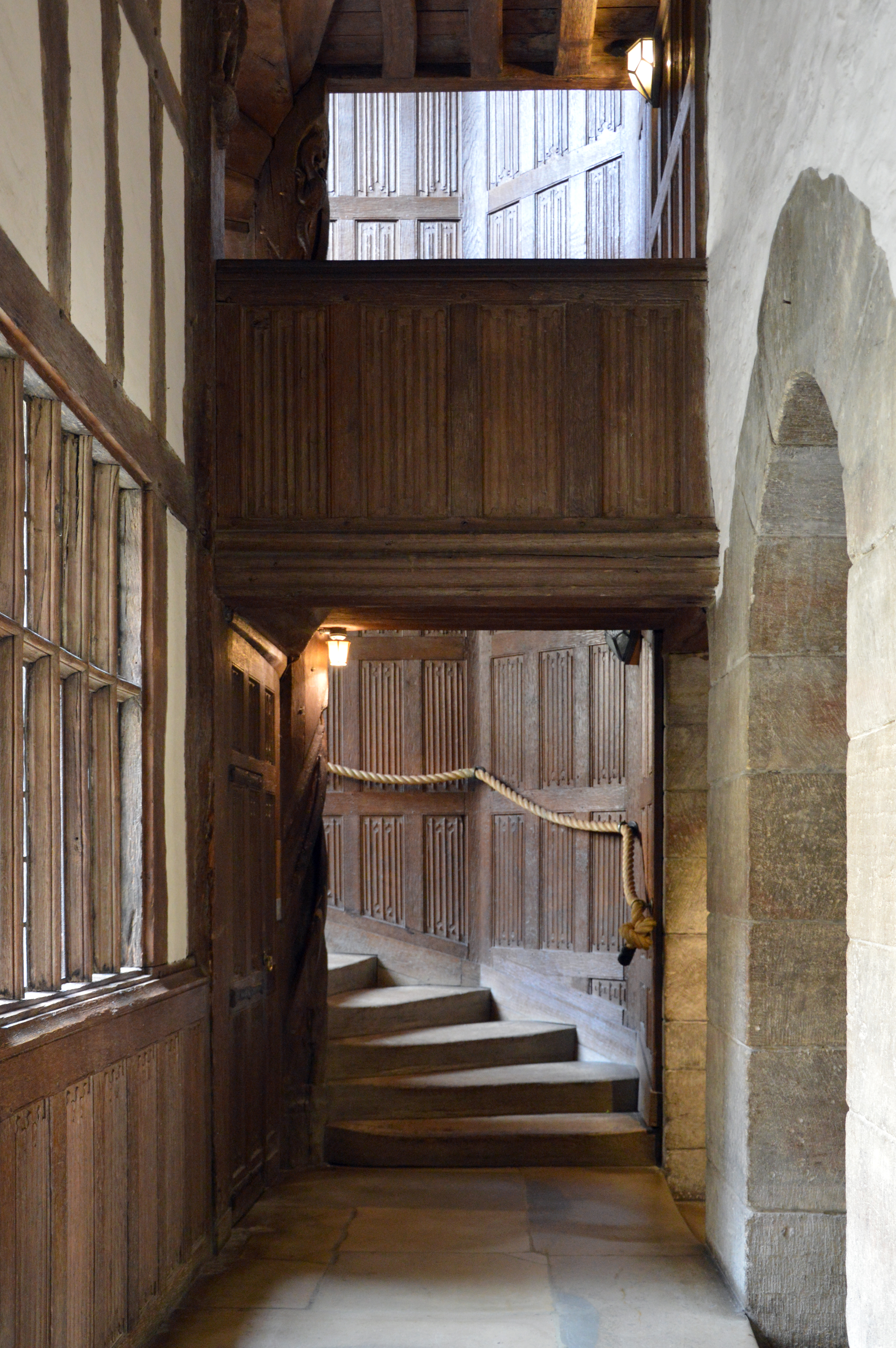
French designer Armand-Albert Rateau added a spiral staircase in the style of the 16th century to the south side of the Fountain Court

The Wykeham Martins were forced to sell the castle and estate in 1924, in order to meet death duties. The last private owner was the Hon. Olive, Lady Baillie, daughter of Almeric Paget, 1st Baron Queenborough, and his first wife, Pauline Payne Whitney, an American heiress. Lady Baillie, then (previously) married to Martin Wilson Filmer, bought the castle in 1926 for £180,000 (equivalent to £7,424,908 in 2019). When the Wilson Filmers bought the castle it was in poor condition, having not been lived in during the meantime, and parts of the grounds were overgrown. She redecorated the interior, first working with the French architect and designer Armand-Albert Rateau, who oversaw exterior alterations and added interior features such as a 16th-century-style carved-oak staircase, then with the Paris decorator Stéphane Boudin. In total she spent $2 million on the project over the years.

Lady Baillie became renowned as a hostess. The Baillies, who lived during the week in London, held house parties at the castle at the weekends. Frequent visitors to the castle were political friends of Sir Adrian, David Margesson and Geoffrey Lloyd who were to become lifelong friends of Lady Baillie. During the 1930s members of royalty, including the Prince of Wales with Wallis Simpson, the Duke of York, Princess Marina, Queen Maria of Romania, Alfonso XIII of Spain and the Grand Duke Dmitri Pavlovich of Russia were visitors. Other prominent visitors included Sir Alfred Beit, many MPs, including Anthony Eden, and Germany's ambassador to Britain, Joachim von Ribbentrop. Lady Baillie was a lover of the cinema and her guest list during that decade included the film stars Douglas Fairbanks senior and junior, Fredric March, Charlie Chaplin, Errol Flynn, Lili Damita, Robert Taylor, James Stewart and Gertrude Lawrence. Other guests were Margaret, Duchess of Argyll, Barbara Hutton, the author Ian Fleming, and the singer Richard Tauber and his wife Diana Napier.

During the early part of World War II the castle was used as a hospital where Lady Baillie and her daughters hosted burned Commonwealth airmen as part of their recovery. Survivors remembered the experience with fondness. After the war, hospitality for prominent guests resumed, but on a smaller scale than in the 1930s. David Margesson and Geoffrey Lloyd continued to visit frequently. Members of the royal family continued to be invited, including Queen Elizabeth the Queen Mother and Princess Marina. Another frequent visitor was Lady Baillie's cousin, John Hay Whitney, the U.S. Ambassador to Great Britain.

Upon her death in 1974, Lady Baillie left the castle to the Leeds Castle Foundation, a private charitable trust whose aim is to preserve the castle and grounds for the benefit of the public.

An estimated £1.4 million (equivalent to £10.36 million in 2025) was invested and a further £400,000 (£2.96 million in 2025) was retrieved from the sale of the furniture to make improvements to the Castle and attract paying corporate conferences. However, it was quickly understood that it could not support the ongoing costs of running the Estate, so in 1975 the gardens were opened to the public, and the following year the Castle was also made available to visitors.

On 17 July 1978, the castle was the site of a meeting between Egyptian Foreign Minister Muhammad Ibrahim Kamel, Israeli Foreign Minister Moshe Dayan and US Secretary of State Cyrus Vance in preparation for the Camp David Accords. The castle also hosted the Northern Ireland peace talks held in September 2004 led by Tony Blair.

In October 2021, Leeds Castle Foundation was one of 142 recipients across England to receive part of a £35 million grant from the government's Culture Recovery Fund.

In 1952, the castle was named a Grade I listed building and recognised as an internationally important structure. The listing summary states: "Castle. Early-to-mid C12, with C13, C14, C15 and C16 alterations. Partly rebuilt 1822". The research records at Historic England state that the castle was also "extensively rebuilt in ... 1926".

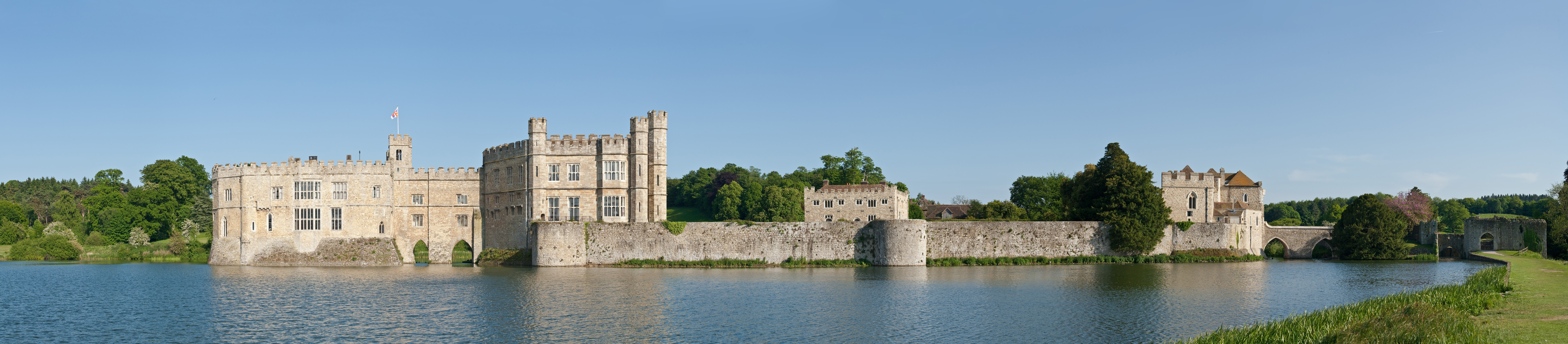
A wide panoramic view of Leeds Castle from across the moat on the north west side
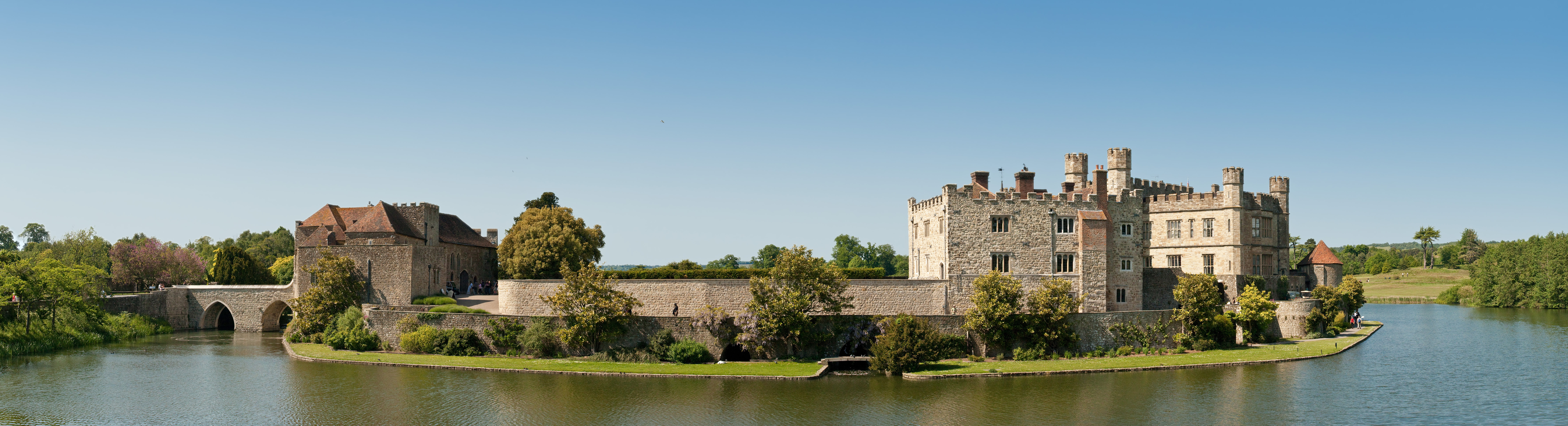
Leeds Castle and its moat from the rear

== Tourism ==
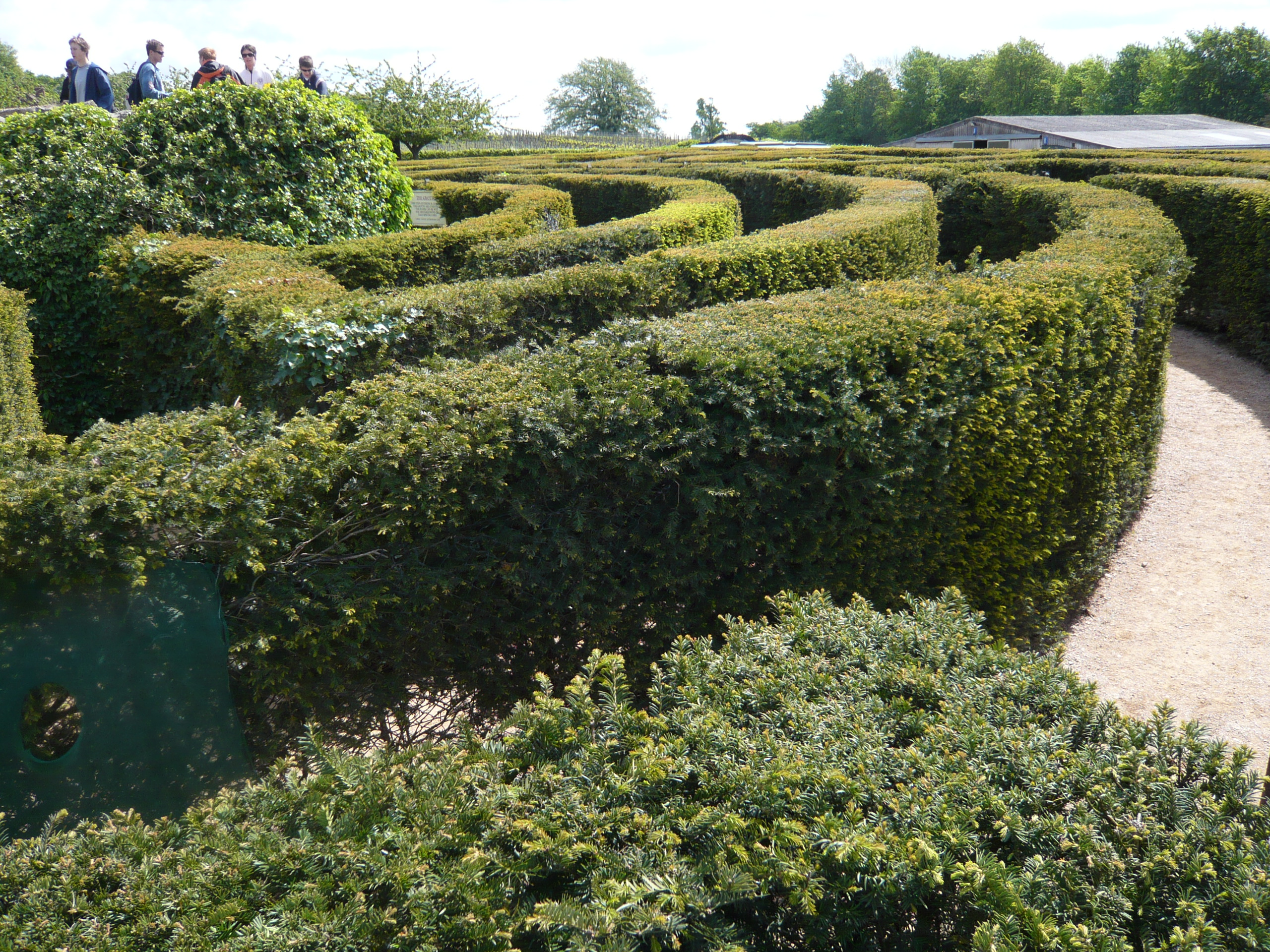
The maze at Leeds Castle was made with 2,400 yew trees and opened in 1988

An aviary was added in 1980 and by 2011 contained over 100 species, but closed in 2012 to save its £200,000 a year running cost. The replacement Birds of Prey Centre, includes hawks on display and free-flying falconry displays.

The castle and its grounds are a major leisure destination with a golf course and what may be the world's only museum of dog collars. There are two castle-themed children's adventure play areas targeted at the under sevens and the under fourteens. A maze opened in 1988, constructed of 2,400 yew trees with the general appearance of a topiary castle. The centre is on a raised viewpoint, which also contains an exit through a shell grotto. The castle also offers accommodations for tourists including rental rooms and a campsite area with luxury tents called Knight's Glamping.

In 1998, Leeds Castle was one of 57 heritage sites in England to receive more than 200,000 visitors. According to figures released by the Association of Leading Visitor Attractions, 468,574 people visited the castle in 2025. Due to travel and other restrictions as a result of the COVID-19 pandemic, the number of visitors in 2020 had declined to 389,363 in that year.

In 2026, Leeds Castle opened Pilgrimage of Love: Eleanor of Castile, an exhibition about the life of Eleanor of Castile. The exhibition features a life-sized artificial intelligence avatar of Eleanor, which allows visitors to ask questions and receive answers based on historical research.

Leeds Castle hosted an annual concert from 1978 until 2026. The concerts ended in 2026 after the operator, Heritage Events Ltd, decided to step down at the end of their contractual agreement.

== Filming location ==
The castle was a location for the Ealing Comedy film Kind Hearts and Coronets (1949) as a stand-in for 'Chalfont', the ancestral home of the aristocratic d'Ascoyne family. It also appeared in the films The Moonraker (1958) and Waltz of the Toreadors (1962). It was used for filming of Purge of Kingdoms (2019) starring Armando Gutierrez and Angus Macfadyen.

On the small screen, the castle and grounds provided all the filming locations for a Doctor Who serial, The Androids of Tara, in 1978. Cliff Richard performed a live concert at the location (released on DVD), with Leeds Castle as a backdrop, titled Castles in the Air.

The castle has been used for The Hollow Crown television series, for a Bollywood action movie called Rustom and for "Darkest Hour", "Casanova, Classic Mary Berry (BBC1), Who Do You Think You Are special with Danny Dyer, Antiques Roadtrip (BBC1), and What Would Your Kid Do? (ITV)".

== Castle interior ==
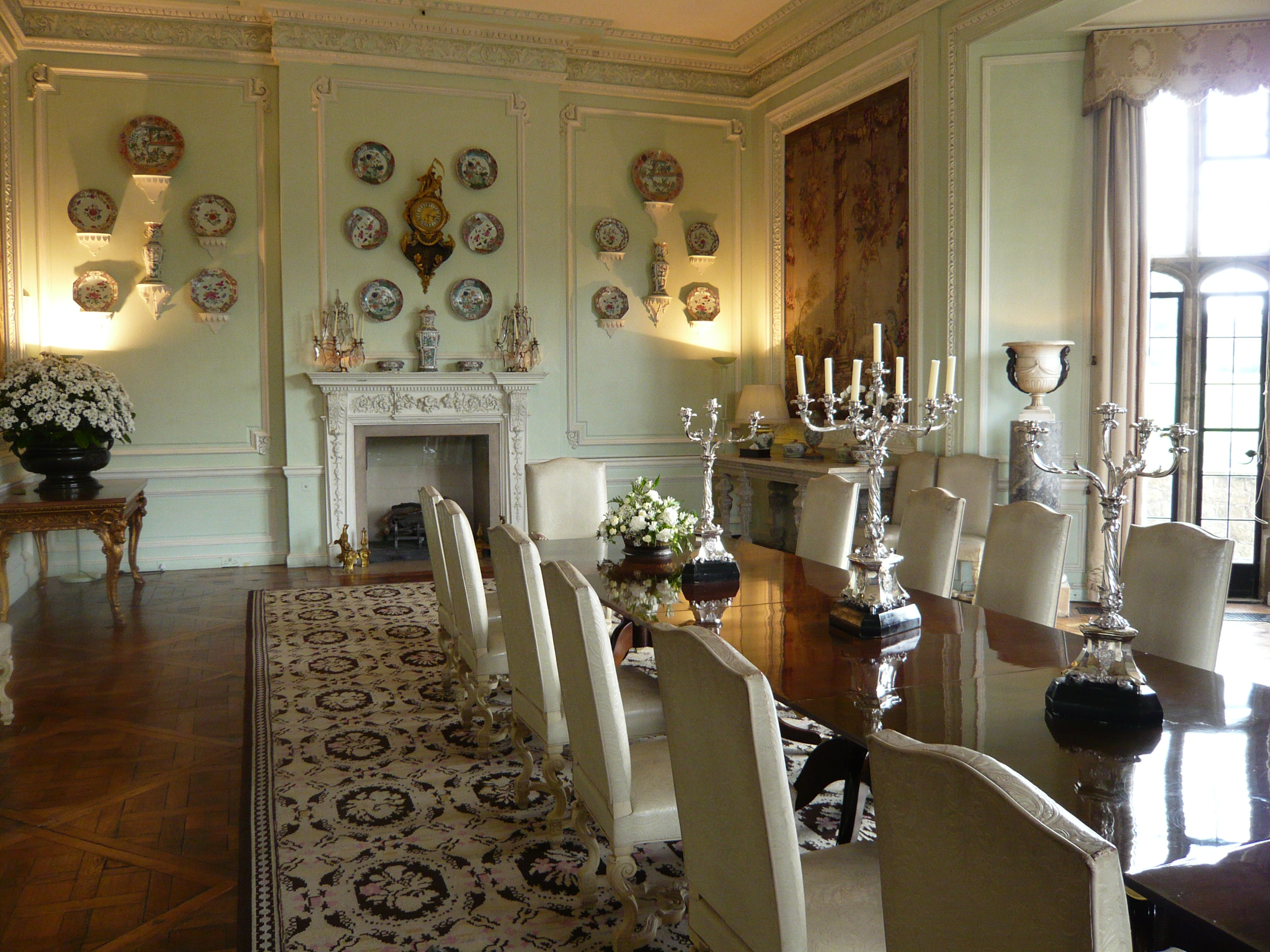
Dining room

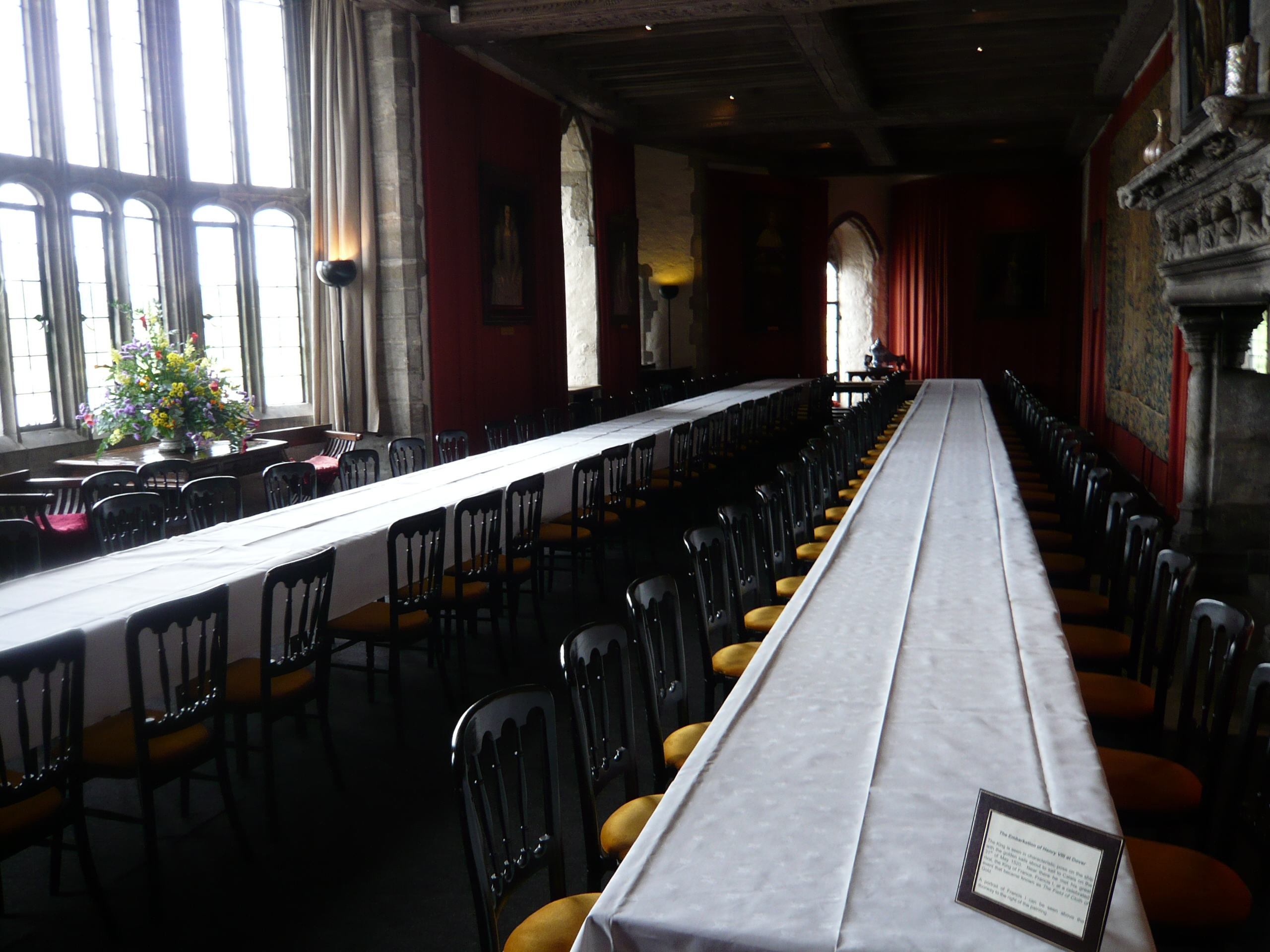
Banqueting hall

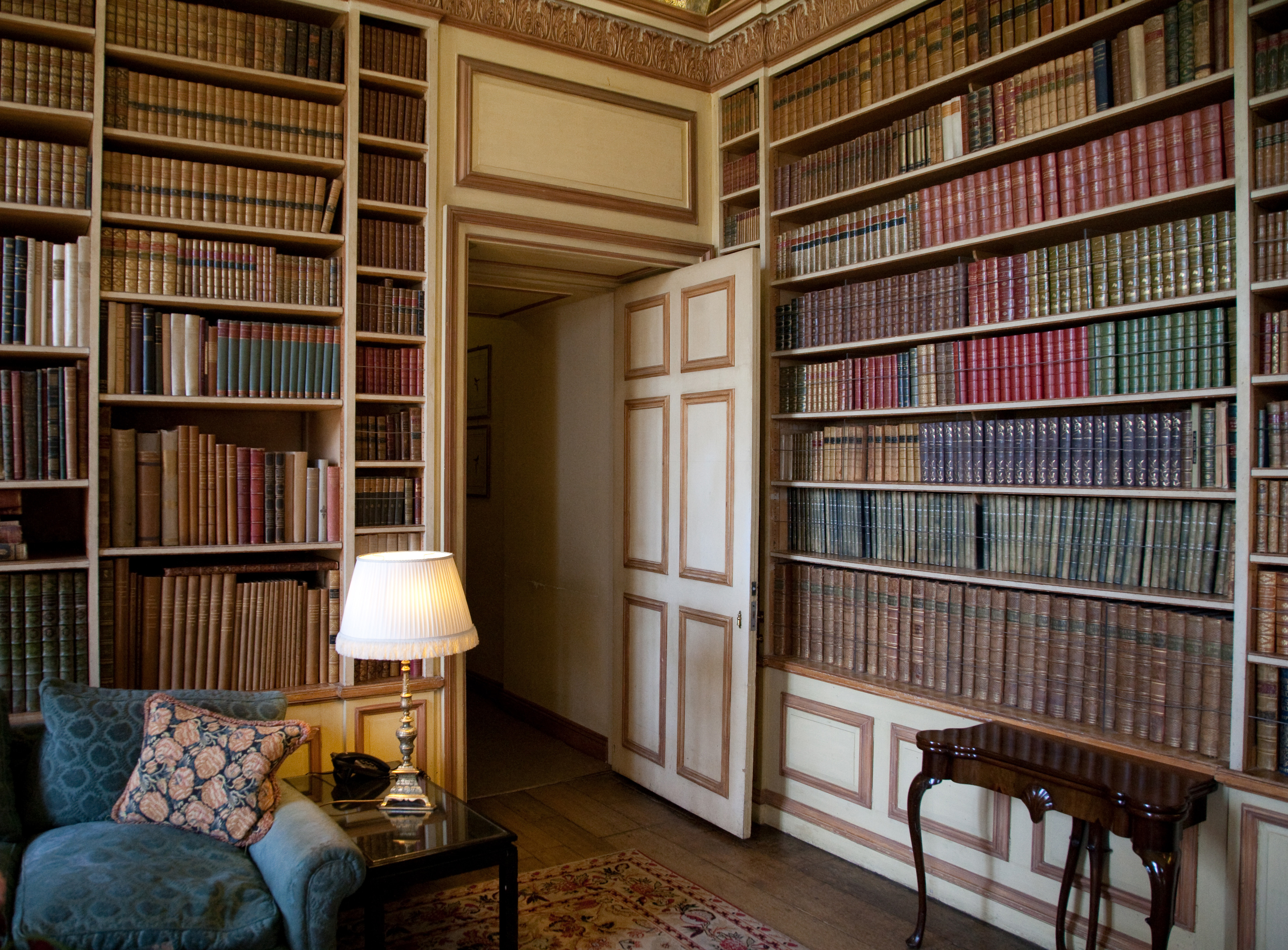
Library

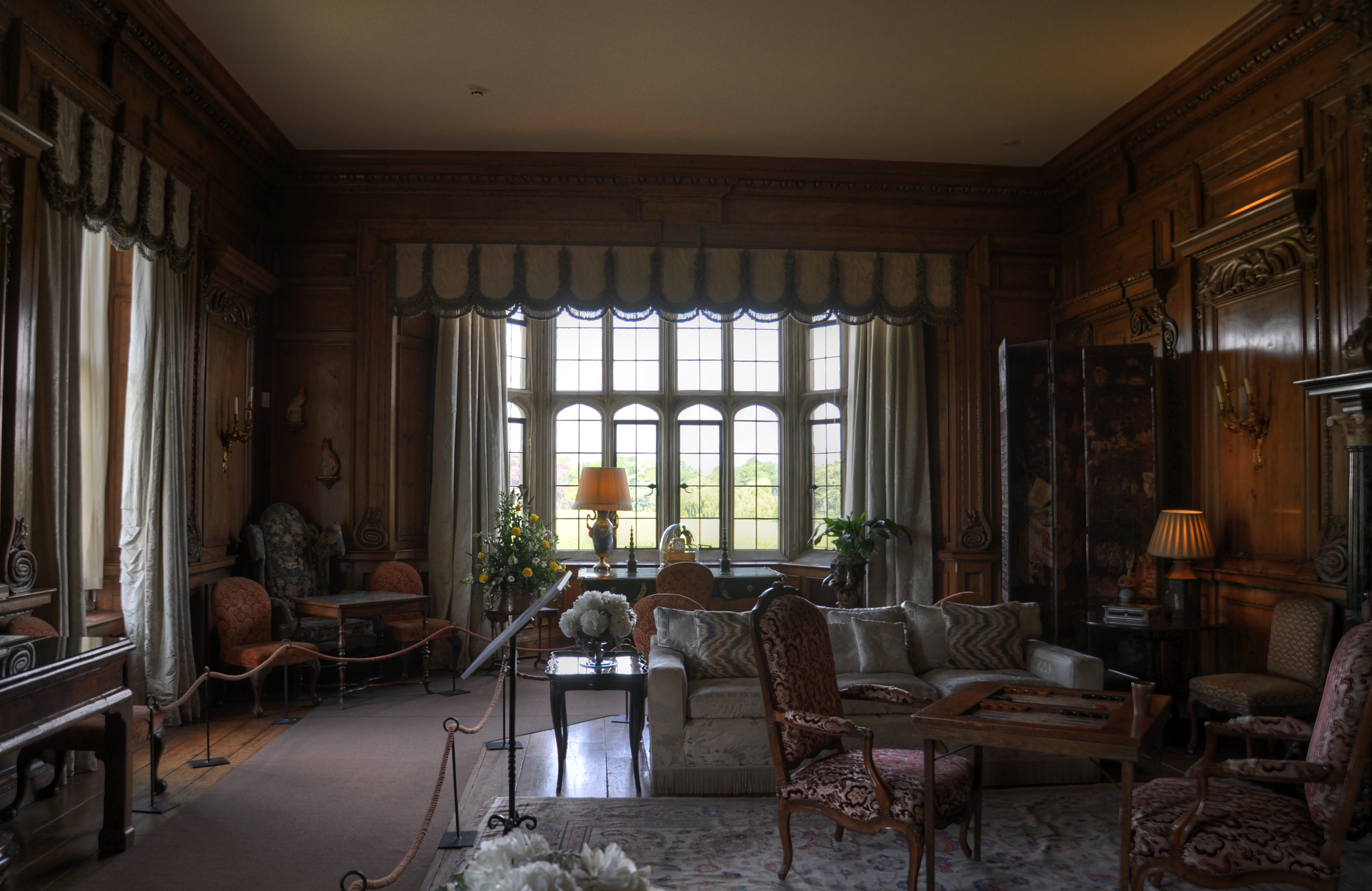
Thorpe Hall drawing room

== See also ==
- Castles in Great Britain and Ireland
- Grade I listed buildings in Maidstone
- List of castles in England
