= Pauline Payne Whitney =

American heiress

- Born: March 21, 1874; New York City, U.S.
- Died: November 22, 1916 (aged 42); Esher, Surrey, U.K.
- Spouse: Almeric Hugh Paget (m. 1895)
- Children: Olive Cecilia Paget; Dorothy Wyndham Paget
- Parent(s): William Collins Whitney; Flora Payne Whitney
- Relatives: See Whitney family

Pauline Payne Whitney Paget (March 21, 1874 – November 22, 1916), was an American heiress and a member of the prominent Whitney family.

== Early life ==
She was born in New York City, New York, to William Collins Whitney and Flora (née Payne) Whitney. Her father was corporation counsel for New York City from 1875 to 1882, United States Secretary of the Navy from 1885 to 1889 (under President Grover Cleveland), and a force in street-railway affairs until his retirement in 1902. Pauline Whitney had her social debut in 1892.

She received a large fortune from her uncle, Colonel Oliver Hazard Payne (1839-1917), one of the founders and original directors of the Standard Oil Company. Shortly before her death she divided $4,000,000 between her two daughters.

== Personal life ==
On November 12, 1895, she was married to the British-born Almeric Hugh Paget (1861-1949). He was educated at Harrow, and was the sixth and youngest son of Cecilia (née Wyndham) Paget and Lord Alfred Paget, and a grandson of Henry Paget, 1st Marquess of Anglesey, who commanded the British cavalry at the Battle of Waterloo in 1815. The marriage was solemnized at St. Thomas's Church, New York City, and among those attending it was President Grover Cleveland.

With Paget she had two daughters, but the marriage was not entirely happy.

- Olive Cecilia (1899-1974), who married three times and was the owner of Leeds Castle.
- Dorothy Wyndham (1905-1960), who never married.

=== Move to England ===
In 1893, her husband joined Henry Melville Whitney in establishing the Dominion Coal Company Ltd. and, in 1901, the Dominion Iron and Steel Company, Ltd. at Sydney, Nova Scotia. That same year, the Pagets moved to England, ostensibly because of Pauline's ill health. Paget was later elected to the Parliament of the United Kingdom as the Unionist party candidate for Cambridge, serving from 1910 to 1917.

During the First World War, at the Summerdown convalescent camp in Eastbourne and at other facilities in England, she organized the Almeric Paget Massage Corps to provide physiotherapy to injured soldiers by trained masseuses. During this time, she became known as the "Angel of Summerdown". The corps started in late 1914 and continued to operate after her death.

=== Death and burial ===
Pauline Paget died after a three weeks' illness at Esher, Surrey, on November 22, 1916, at the age of forty-two. She was buried at Hertingfordbury, Hertfordshire. Following her death, her husband resigned from the House of Commons and was elevated to the peerage as Baron Queenborough. Lord Queensborough later remarried to another American heiress, Edith Starr Miller, with whom he had three additional daughters before their divorce.
