= Tonbridge (constituency) =

UK Parliament constituency (1918–1974, 2024 onwards)

Coordinates: 50.99°N 0.24°E

- County constituency for the House of Commons
- Boundaries since 2024
- Boundary of Tonbridge in South East England
- Electorate: 73,692 (2023)
- Major settlements: Tonbridge, Edenbridge, Borough Green, Hildenborough

Current constituency
- Created: 2024
- Member of Parliament: Thomas Tugendhat (Conservative)
- Seats: One
- Created from: Tonbridge and Malling; Sevenoaks (minor part); Dartford (minor part)

1918–Feb 1974
- Seats: One
- Created from: Tunbridge
- Replaced by: Tonbridge and Malling

Tonbridge is a parliamentary constituency in Kent, centred on the town of Tonbridge. It returns one Member of Parliament (MP) to the House of Commons of the Parliament of the United Kingdom. It is currently held by Conservative Thomas Tugendhat, who was MP for the predecessor seat of Tonbridge and Malling from 2015 to 2024.

The constituency was created for the 1918 general election, replacing the previous Tunbridge constituency. It was abolished for the February 1974 general election, when it was replaced by the new Tonbridge and Malling constituency.

Following the 2023 periodic review of Westminster constituencies, the seat was re-established and was first contested in the 2024 general election, formed primarily from the previous and largely overlapping constituency of Tonbridge and Malling.

== Constituency profile ==
High Street, Tonbridge

Tonbridge is a constituency in Kent in South East England, covering parts of the Tonbridge and Malling and Sevenoaks districts. It is named after its largest town, Tonbridge, which has a population of around 37,000. Other settlements include the town of Edenbridge and the villages of Hildenborough, Hadlow, Borough Green, New Ash Green and Hartley.

This constituency covers a mostly rural area centred on Tonbridge and includes the villages to its north and west. Much of the constituency consists of woodlands and rolling hills; the Kent Downs and High Weald National Landscapes pass through here. Tonbridge is a historic market town with a tradition of rural industries like woodworking. It also serves as an important railway junction linking Hastings and Ashford to London, which is located around 28 miles (45 km) north-west of Tonbridge. This constituency is mostly wealthy, with Tonbridge town in particular being highly affluent. House prices are generally higher than the rest of South East England and considerably higher than the UK average.

Tonbridge has an above-average retired population and a low proportion of young adults. Residents have high levels of income and homeownership and the child poverty rate is around half the UK-wide rate. They have average levels of education and a high proportion work in the retail, education and construction sectors. The percentage of residents claiming unemployment benefits is low. White people made up 93% of the population at the 2021 census.

At the local council level, Tonbridge is mostly represented by Green Party councillors whilst Edenbridge and the rural villages elected primarily Conservatives with some Liberal Democrat, Green Party and Reform UK representation. An estimated 54% of voters in the Tonbridge constituency supported leaving the European Union in the 2016 referendum, marginally higher than the UK-wide figure of 52%.

== Boundaries ==
=== Historic ===
1918–1950: The Borough of Royal Tunbridge Wells, the Urban Districts of Tonbridge and Southborough, and Tonbridge Rural District.

1950–1974: As 1918 but with redrawn boundaries.

=== Current ===
The re-established constituency id defined as being composed of the following as they existed on 1 December 2020:

- The District of Sevenoaks wards of: Ash and New Ash Green; Cowden and Hever; Edenbridge North and East; Edenbridge South and West; Hartley and Hodsoll Street; Leigh and Chiddingstone Causeway; Penshurst, Fordcombe and Chiddingstone.
- The Borough of Tonbridge and Malling wards of: Borough Green and Long Mill; Cage Green; Castle; Downs and Mereworth; Hadlow and East Peckham; Higham; Hildenborough; Judd; Medway; Trench; Vauxhall; Wateringbury; Wrotham, Ightham and Stansted.

Following a local government boundary review in Tonbridge and Malling which came into effect in May 2023, the constituency is now composed of the following from the 2024 general election:

- The District of Sevenoaks wards of: Ash and New Ash Green; Cowden and Hever; Edenbridge North and East; Edenbridge South and West; Hartley and Hodsoll Street; Leigh and Chiddingstone Causeway; Penshurst, Fordcombe and Chiddingstone.
- The Borough of Tonbridge and Malling wards of: Birling, Leybourne & Ryarsh (part); Borough Green & Platt; Bourne; Cage Green & Angel; East and West Peckham, Mereworth & Wateringbury; East Malling, West Malling & Offham (small part); Higham; Hildenborough; Judd; Pilgrims with Ightham; Trench; Vauxhall.

The reformed constituency comprises the bulk of the preceding Tonbridge and Malling seat (excluding East and West Malling), plus an additional two District of Sevenoaks wards to the north - Ash and New Ash Green, and Hartley and Hodsoll Street, from the constituencies of Sevenoaks and Dartford respectively.

== Members of Parliament ==
=== MPs 1918–1974 ===
Tunbridge prior to 1918

| Election | Member | Party | Notes |
|---|---|---|---|
| 1918 | Herbert Spender-Clay | Conservative | Died 1937 |
| 1937 by-election | Sir Adrian Baillie, Bt | Conservative | |
| 1945 | Gerald Williams | Conservative | Resigned 1956 |
| 1956 by-election | Richard Hornby | Conservative | |
| Feb 1974 | constituency abolished | | |

=== MPs since 2024 ===
Tonbridge and Malling prior to 2024

| Election | Member | Party |
|---|---|---|
| 2024 | Tom Tugendhat | Conservative |

== Elections ==
=== Elections in the 2020s ===
General election 2024: Tonbridge
| Party | Candidate | Votes | % | ±% |
|---|---|---|---|---|
| Conservative | Tom Tugendhat | 20,517 | 40.8 | −24.0 |
| Labour | Lewis Bailey | 9,351 | 18.6 | +3.5 |
| Green | Anna Cope | 7,596 | 15.1 | +7.2 |
| Reform | Teresa Hansford | 7,548 | 15.0 | N/A |
| Liberal Democrats | John Woollcombe | 4,234 | 8.4 | −3.9 |
| Ind. Alliance | Tim Shaw | 926 | 1.8 | N/A |
| SDP | Ian Grattidge | 156 | 0.3 | N/A |
| Majority | | 11,166 | 22.2 | −27.5 |
| Turnout | | 50,328 | 68.3 | −5.6 |
| Registered electors | | 72,799 | | |
| Conservative hold | | Swing | −13.8 | |

2019 notional result
| Party | Vote | % |
|---|---|---|
| Conservative | 35,262 | 64.8 |
| Labour | 8,210 | 15.1 |
| Liberal Democrats | 6,690 | 12.3 |
| Green | 4,288 | 7.9 |
| Turnout | 54,450 | 73.9 |
| Electorate | 73,692 | |

== Election results 1918–1974 ==
=== Elections in the 1910s ===
General election 1918: Tonbridge
| Party | | Candidate | Votes | % | ±% |
|---|---|---|---|---|---|
| C | Unionist | Herbert Spender-Clay | 14,622 | 68.1 | |
| | Labour | John Palmer | 5,006 | 23.3 | |
| | Liberal | Thomas Buxton | 1,851 | 8.6 | |
| Majority | | | 9,616 | 44.8 | |
| Turnout | | | 21,479 | 57.4 | |
| | Unionist win (new seat) | | | | |
C indicates candidate endorsed by the coalition government.

=== Elections in the 1920s ===
General election 1922: Tonbridge
| Party | Candidate | Votes | % | ±% |
|---|---|---|---|---|
| Unionist | Herbert Spender-Clay | 14,797 | 53.0 | −15.1 |
| Labour | Joseph Thomas Davies | 7,665 | 27.4 | +4.1 |
| Liberal | Albert Charles Crane | 5,472 | 19.6 | +11.0 |
| Majority | | 7,132 | 25.6 | −19.2 |
| Turnout | | 27,934 | 72.5 | +15.1 |
| Unionist hold | | Swing | | |

General election 1923: Tonbridge
| Party | Candidate | Votes | % | ±% |
|---|---|---|---|---|
| Unionist | Herbert Spender-Clay | 13,910 | 49.8 | −3.2 |
| Liberal | Albert Charles Crane | 7,433 | 26.6 | +7.0 |
| Labour | Joseph Thomas Davis | 6,610 | 23.6 | −3.8 |
| Majority | | 6,477 | 23.2 | −2.4 |
| Turnout | | 27,953 | 70.6 | −1.9 |
| Unionist hold | | Swing | -5.1 | |

General election 1924: Tonbridge
| Party | Candidate | Votes | % | ±% |
|---|---|---|---|---|
| Unionist | Herbert Spender-Clay | 17,392 | 58.2 | +8.4 |
| Labour | W F Toynbee | 6,564 | 22.0 | −1.6 |
| Liberal | James Millard Tucker | 5,898 | 19.8 | −6.8 |
| Majority | | 10,828 | 36.2 | +13.0 |
| Turnout | | 29,854 | 74.3 | +3.7 |
| Unionist hold | | Swing | | |

General election 1929: Tonbridge
| Party | Candidate | Votes | % | ±% |
|---|---|---|---|---|
| Unionist | Herbert Spender-Clay | 19,018 | 49.8 | −8.4 |
| Liberal | Gordon Alchin | 10,025 | 26.2 | +6.4 |
| Labour | W F Toynbee | 9,149 | 24.0 | +2.0 |
| Majority | | 8,993 | 23.6 | −12.6 |
| Turnout | | 38,192 | 72.3 | −2.0 |
| Unionist hold | | Swing | -7.4 | |

=== Elections in the 1930s ===
General election 1931: Tonbridge
| Party | Candidate | Votes | % | ±% |
|---|---|---|---|---|
| Conservative | Herbert Spender-Clay | 30,602 | 78.8 | +29.0 |
| Labour | Constance Borrett | 8,208 | 21.1 | −2.9 |
| Majority | | 22,394 | 57.7 | +34.1 |
| Turnout | | 38,810 | 69.2 | −3.0 |
| Conservative hold | | Swing | | |

General election 1935: Tonbridge
| Party | Candidate | Votes | % | ±% |
|---|---|---|---|---|
| Conservative | Herbert Spender-Clay | 23,460 | 61.3 | −17.5 |
| Labour | F M Landau | 9,405 | 24.6 | +3.5 |
| Liberal | Richard Pope-Hennessy | 5,403 | 14.1 | New |
| Majority | | 14,055 | 36.7 | −21.0 |
| Turnout | | 38,268 | 68.2 | −1.0 |
| Conservative hold | | Swing | | |

1937 Tonbridge by-election
| Party | Candidate | Votes | % | ±% |
|---|---|---|---|---|
| Conservative | Adrian Baillie | 18,802 | 56.9 | −4.4 |
| Labour | H Smith | 8,147 | 24.7 | +0.1 |
| Liberal | Richard Matthews | 6,073 | 18.4 | +4.3 |
| Majority | | 10,655 | 32.2 | −4.5 |
| Turnout | | 33,022 | 58.2 | −10.0 |
| Conservative hold | | Swing | -2.2 | |

General Election 1939–40:

Another General Election was required to take place before the end of 1940. The political parties had been making preparations for an election to take place and by the Autumn of 1939, the following candidates had been selected;

- Conservative: Adrian Baillie
- Labour: R. E. L. Bowyer
- Liberal: Richard Matthews
- British Union: E J Crawford

=== Elections in the 1940s ===
General election 1945: Tonbridge
| Party | Candidate | Votes | % | ±% |
|---|---|---|---|---|
| Conservative | Gerald Williams | 23,081 | 49.9 | −7.0 |
| Labour | Vera Dart | 16,590 | 35.8 | +11.1 |
| Liberal | John Metcalfe | 5,351 | 11.6 | −6.8 |
| Medical | E F St John Lyburn (Note: Lyburn stood under the label of 'Medical' candidate. He advocated the setting up of diagnostic clinics.) | 1,249 | 2.7 | New |
| Majority | | 6,491 | 14.1 | −18.1 |
| Turnout | | 46,271 | 73.2 | +15.0 |
| Conservative hold | | Swing | | |

=== Elections in the 1950s ===
General election 1950: Tonbridge
| Party | Candidate | Votes | % | ±% |
|---|---|---|---|---|
| Conservative | Gerald Williams | 27,893 | 51.9 | |
| Labour | Brian Clapham | 19,525 | 36.3 | |
| Liberal | Leslie Albert Willard | 5,634 | 10.5 | |
| Ind. Conservative | E F St. John Lyburn | 739 | 1.4 | |
| Majority | | 8,368 | 15.6 | |
| Turnout | | 53,791 | 83.5 | |
| Conservative hold | | Swing | | |

General election 1951: Tonbridge
| Party | Candidate | Votes | % | ±% |
|---|---|---|---|---|
| Conservative | Gerald Williams | 31,377 | 59.8 | +7.9 |
| Labour | Bernard Bagnari | 21,109 | 40.2 | +3.9 |
| Majority | | 10,268 | 19.6 | +4.0 |
| Turnout | | 52,486 | 80.6 | −2.9 |
| Conservative hold | | Swing | | |

General election 1955: Tonbridge
| Party | Candidate | Votes | % | ±% |
|---|---|---|---|---|
| Conservative | Gerald Williams | 29,521 | 60.4 | +0.6 |
| Labour | Robert L Fagg | 19,325 | 39.6 | −0.6 |
| Majority | | 10,196 | 20.8 | +1.2 |
| Turnout | | 48,846 | 75.5 | −5.1 |
| Conservative hold | | Swing | | |

1956 Tonbridge by-election
| Party | Candidate | Votes | % | ±% |
|---|---|---|---|---|
| Conservative | Richard Hornby | 20,515 | 52.0 | −8.4 |
| Labour | Robert L Fagg | 18,913 | 48.0 | +8.4 |
| Majority | | 1,602 | 4.0 | −16.8 |
| Turnout | | 39,428 | | |
| Conservative hold | | Swing | | |

General election 1959: Tonbridge
| Party | Candidate | Votes | % | ±% |
|---|---|---|---|---|
| Conservative | Richard Hornby | 31,687 | 59.9 | −0.5 |
| Labour | Kenneth W May | 21,181 | 40.1 | +0.5 |
| Majority | | 10,506 | 19.8 | −1.0 |
| Turnout | | 52,868 | 78.5 | +3.0 |
| Conservative hold | | Swing | | |

=== Elections in the 1960s ===
General election 1964: Tonbridge
| Party | Candidate | Votes | % | ±% |
|---|---|---|---|---|
| Conservative | Richard Hornby | 27,802 | 49.2 | −10.7 |
| Labour | Donald Savage | 19,037 | 33.7 | −6.4 |
| Liberal | Edward Babbs | 9,682 | 17.1 | New |
| Majority | | 8,765 | 15.5 | −4.3 |
| Turnout | | 56,521 | 78.7 | +0.2 |
| Conservative hold | | Swing | | |

General election 1966: Tonbridge
| Party | Candidate | Votes | % | ±% |
|---|---|---|---|---|
| Conservative | Richard Hornby | 26,896 | 46.7 | −2.5 |
| Labour | William Eric Wolff | 20,068 | 34.9 | +1.2 |
| Liberal | Colin Bloy | 10,586 | 18.4 | +1.3 |
| Majority | | 6,828 | 11.8 | −3.7 |
| Turnout | | 57,550 | 77.3 | −1.4 |
| Conservative hold | | Swing | | |

=== Elections in the 1970s ===
General election 1970: Tonbridge
| Party | Candidate | Votes | % | ±% |
|---|---|---|---|---|
| Conservative | Richard Hornby | 31,890 | 53.2 | +4.5 |
| Labour | Maureen Colquhoun | 17,897 | 29.9 | −5.0 |
| Liberal | Harry Hill | 10,167 | 17.0 | −1.4 |
| Majority | | 13,993 | 23.3 | +11.5 |
| Turnout | | 59,954 | 72.0 | −5.3 |
| Conservative hold | | Swing | | |

== See also ==
- List of parliamentary constituencies in Kent
- List of parliamentary constituencies in the South East England (region)
