= Charles W. Morse =

American businessman (1856–1933)

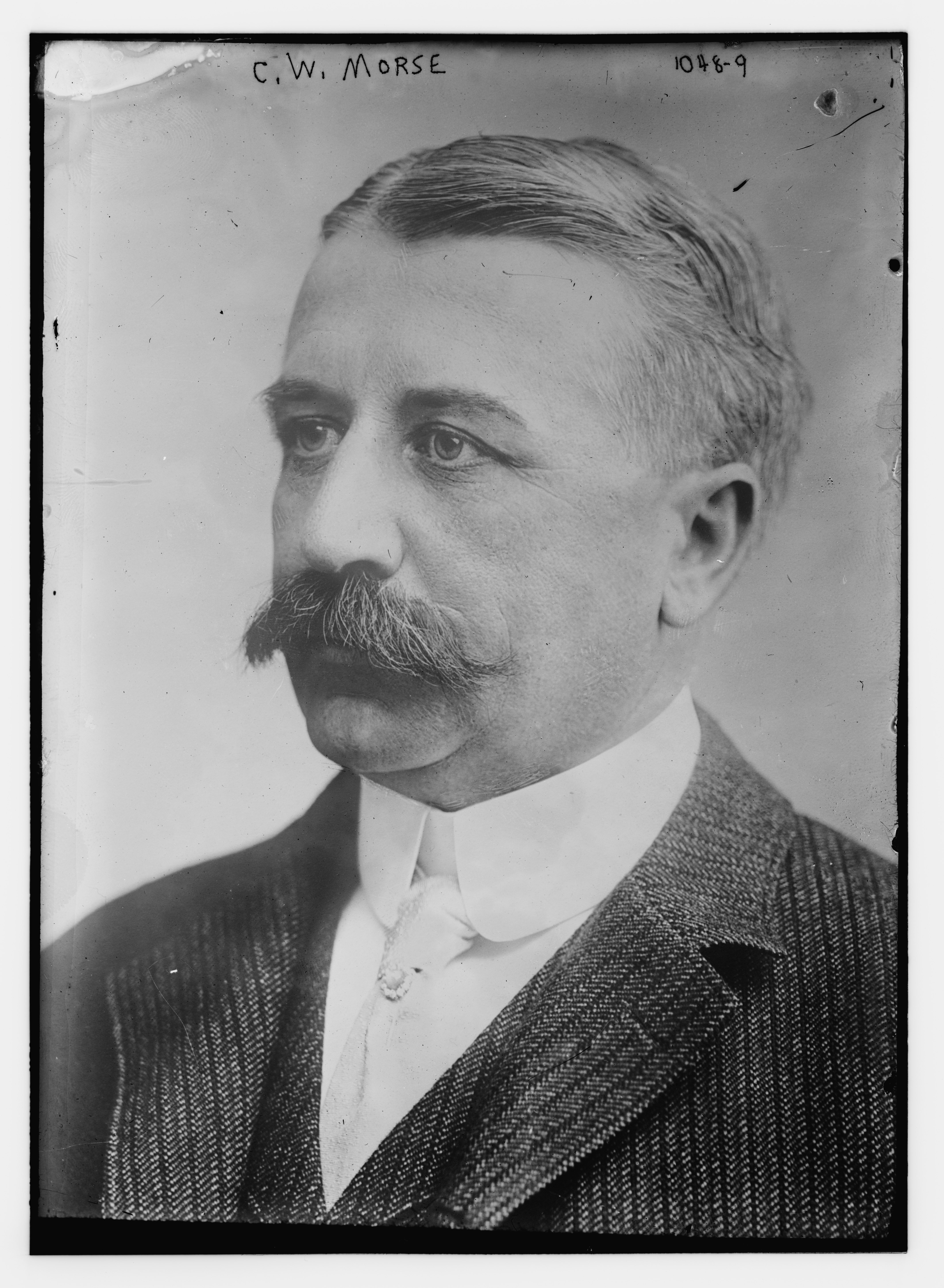
- Born: October 21, 1856; Bath, Maine
- Died: January 12, 1933 (aged 76); Bath, Maine
- Education: Bowdoin College
- Occupations: Banker, businessperson
- Criminal charges: Fraud, war profiteering

Charles Wyman Morse (October 21, 1856 – January 12, 1933) was an American businessman and speculator who committed frauds and engaged in corrupt business practices. At one point, he controlled 13 banks. Known as the "Ice King" early in his career out of New York City, through Tammany Hall corruption he established a monopoly in New York's ice business, before buying several shipping companies and moving into high finance. His attempt to manipulate the price of copper-shares set off a wave of selling that developed into the Panic of 1907. Jailed for violating federal banking laws, he faked serious illness and was released. Later, he was indicted for war profiteering and fraud.

== Early life and education ==
Morse was born in Bath, Maine, in 1856, the son of Benjamin Wyman and Anna Eliza Jane (Rodbird) Morse. His father had a large role in the towing business on the Kennebec River. Charles was already involved in the shipping business while a student at Bowdoin College, and at his graduation in 1877, he had accumulated a sizable capital. After college, he went into business with his father and a cousin, Harry F. Morse, forming C.W. Morse & Company and engaging in an extensive business shipping ice and lumber.

== Career ==
As his business interests grew, Morse moved to Boston and, in 1897, New York City.

=== The "Ice Trust" ===
He organized the Consolidated Ice Company in 1897 and went into the ice business. In 1899, he merged it with several other companies to form the American Ice Company which, grossly overcapitalized at $60 million, held a virtual monopoly for ice in New York. Morse quickly became known as "The Ice King". At that time, commercial ice was cut from frozen rivers, much of it in Morse's native state of Maine.

On May 1, 1900, Morse attempted to use his monopoly to raise the price of ice. The plan backfired, however, and it was revealed by the New York Journal and Advertiser that Morse had obtained special privileges from Tammany Hall to run his business, and in exchange, Robert Van Wyck (New York City's first mayor over the five united boroughs) had been given a substantial ownership share in the ice companies (by then known as the "Ice Trust") as had Richard Croker, the boss of Tammany Hall. Having formed a holding company called the Ice Securities Company, Morse manipulated its stock and left the ice business with a profit of some $12 million.

=== Shipping and banking ===
On June 18, 1901, he married Clemence Dodge, a divorcee from Atlanta, at the Fifth Avenue Presbyterian Church in Manhattan. The Morses lived at 724 Fifth Avenue, before moving to Lakewood Township, New Jersey. They maintained a summer home in Bath, Maine. Their marriage was annulled, however, in 1904 when it was determined that Clemence's divorce from her first husband, Charles F. Dodge, was not legal and she was therefore still married to him. Undeterred, she was represented by Samuel Untermyer, who restored her marital rights; she remained devotedly at the side of Morse until her death in 1926.

Morse returned to the realm of shipping in 1901 when he established the Eastern Steamship Company as a consolidation of three existing lines. These were the Boston and Bangor Steamship Company, dating from 1834; the Portland Steam Packet Company, organized in 1843; and the International Steamship Company, established in 1859.

In 1902, Morse acquired control of both overnight steamboat lines on the Hudson River - the People's Line, established in 1835, and the Citizens' Line, established in 1872 - and organized the Hudson Navigation Company to operate them. They were collectively known as the Hudson River Night Line. The People's Line named its new 411-foot steamer C.W. Morse in his honor in 1904. (Morse's uncle James Thomas Morse, his father's brother, was the namesake of the Rockland-Bar Harbor, Maine, steamer J.T. Morse, also built in 1904.)

Morse acquired control of the Metropolitan Steamship Company from the Whitney interests in 1906. He organized the Consolidated Steamship Company in January 1907 as a holding company for the Eastern Steamship Company, Metropolitan Steamship Company, Clyde Steamship Company and Mallory Steamship Company. Despite an initial announcement of such a sale, Morse failed in an attempt to purchase the Long Island Sound steamers of the New York, New Haven and Hartford Railroad. He did, however, acquire control of the New York and Cuba Mail Steamship Company and the New York and Porto Rico Steamship Company in 1907.

He parlayed this success into a prominent role in high finance in New York City. Morse controlled the National Bank of North America and the New Amsterdam National Bank and was a large owner of the Mercantile National Bank. He became a close associate of F. Augustus Heinze, who became president of Mercantile National, and E. R. Thomas, a young man of large inherited fortune. Their influence grew—Heinze and Morse served as directors together on at least six national banks, 10 state banks, five trust companies and four insurance companies.

=== Panic of 1907 ===
By 1907, he was a member of the Consolidated Stock Exchange of New York, one of around 13,000.

Along with Augustus Heinze's brothers, Morse helped create a pool of money to drive up and corner the stock of United Copper. On October 15, 1907 this corner failed so spectacularly that depositors with Morse's banks began to pull out their deposits. On October 20, the New York Clearing House, which had a critical role clearing checks between banks, forced Morse to resign from his banking interests. This did not stop the panic, however, which went on to topple the Knickerbocker Trust Company, New York's third largest trust, and led to financial turmoil across the country through November. The Morse-controlled steamship lines went into receivership, for varying periods, in February 1908.

Indicted by United States District Attorney Henry L. Stimson, Morse was convicted of misappropriating funds from a bank. He was sentenced to 15 years in the Atlanta federal penitentiary in November 1908 but remained free on appeal.

On October 8, 1909, the assets of the Metropolitan Steamship Company were sold at foreclosure sale to John W. McKinnon of Chicago. The company was reincorporated three days later in Maine with Morse as president. The Metropolitan Steamship Company and Maine Steamship Company were consolidated with the Eastern Steamship Company in 1911 to form Eastern Steamship Corporation. This concern went into receivership in 1914 and emerged in 1917 as Eastern Steamship Lines.

Having exhausted his legal appeals, Morse departed for Atlanta penitentiary on January 2, 1910. In Atlanta he was a prisoner alongside Charles Ponzi, who would go on to create an eponymous fraudulent financial scheme, the Ponzi scheme, and earn a legacy as one of the most famous swindlers in American history. Because of Morse's wealth and connections, he launched a campaign of lawyers, lobbyists and famous journalists like Clarence W. Barron who urged President William Howard Taft for leniency. In 1912 Morse became ill, and a panel of Army doctors declared that he suffered from Bright's disease and other maladies and would soon die if he remained in prison. Taft signed his pardon, and Morse departed for medical treatment at Wiesbaden. However, it soon became known to the Justice Department that he had feigned illness by drinking a combination of soapsuds and chemicals. Taft later said that the case "shakes one's faith in expert examination."

=== Later business interests ===
On his return from Europe, Morse returned to the shipping business. He still controlled the Hudson Navigation Company, which had not been involved in the crash of the Consolidated Steamship Company in 1907. Morse announced on January 11, 1916, plans for a new transoceanic steamship line, which he organized as the United States Shipping Company. This holding company exchanged its stock for that of 16 subsidiary companies, each organized around a steamship.

During World War I, he was president of the United States Steamship Company, which was the parent company of Groton Iron Works and Virginia Shipbuilding Corporation. The Virginia Shipbuilding Company won contracts to build 36 vessels for the war effort. The freighters were ordered by the United States Shipping Board, and Morse borrowed from the Emergency Fleet Corporation funds to carry out the contracts. Ultimately, 22 of the ships were completed; the other 14 were cancelled.

Morse controlled the Hudson Navigation Company until its bankruptcy in 1921. The receivers quickly changed the name of the C.W. Morse to Fort Orange.

In 1922, Morse was accused of misrepresentation of his facilities for ship construction; misapplication of funds intended for the building of ships to the building of shipyards; misappropriation of equipment for his own purposes; and failure to turn over to the government the profits of ships it had leased to him. Indicted for war profiteering and fraud, soon after he was confronted with charges of mail fraud involving sales solicitations for stock of the United States Shipping Company. The trial on the war profiteering charges resulted in an acquittal, but a civil suit in 1925 against the Virginia Shipbuilding Company resulted in a judgment for the government of over $11.5 million. The mail fraud case against Morse ended when he was adjudged too ill to stand trial, and his sons were acquitted.

== Personal life and death ==
On April 14, 1884, he married Hattie Bishop Hussey of Brooklyn, New York (granddaughter of Maine shipbuilder T. J. Southard). They had three sons (Benjamin W., Harry F., and Irwin A.) a daughter (Anna, who married Dr. John W. Geiger), and died in 1897.

His second wife, Clemence Dodge, née Cowles, died in July 1926. Suffering from paralysis, Morse was placed under the guardianship of the probate court of Bath on September 7, 1926, adjudged incompetent to handle his affairs. Having suffered several strokes, he died of pneumonia at Bath, Maine, on January 12, 1933.

== See also ==
- List of people pardoned or granted clemency by the president of the United States
