= John D. Ryan (industrialist) =

American industrialist and copper mining magnate

John Dennis Ryan
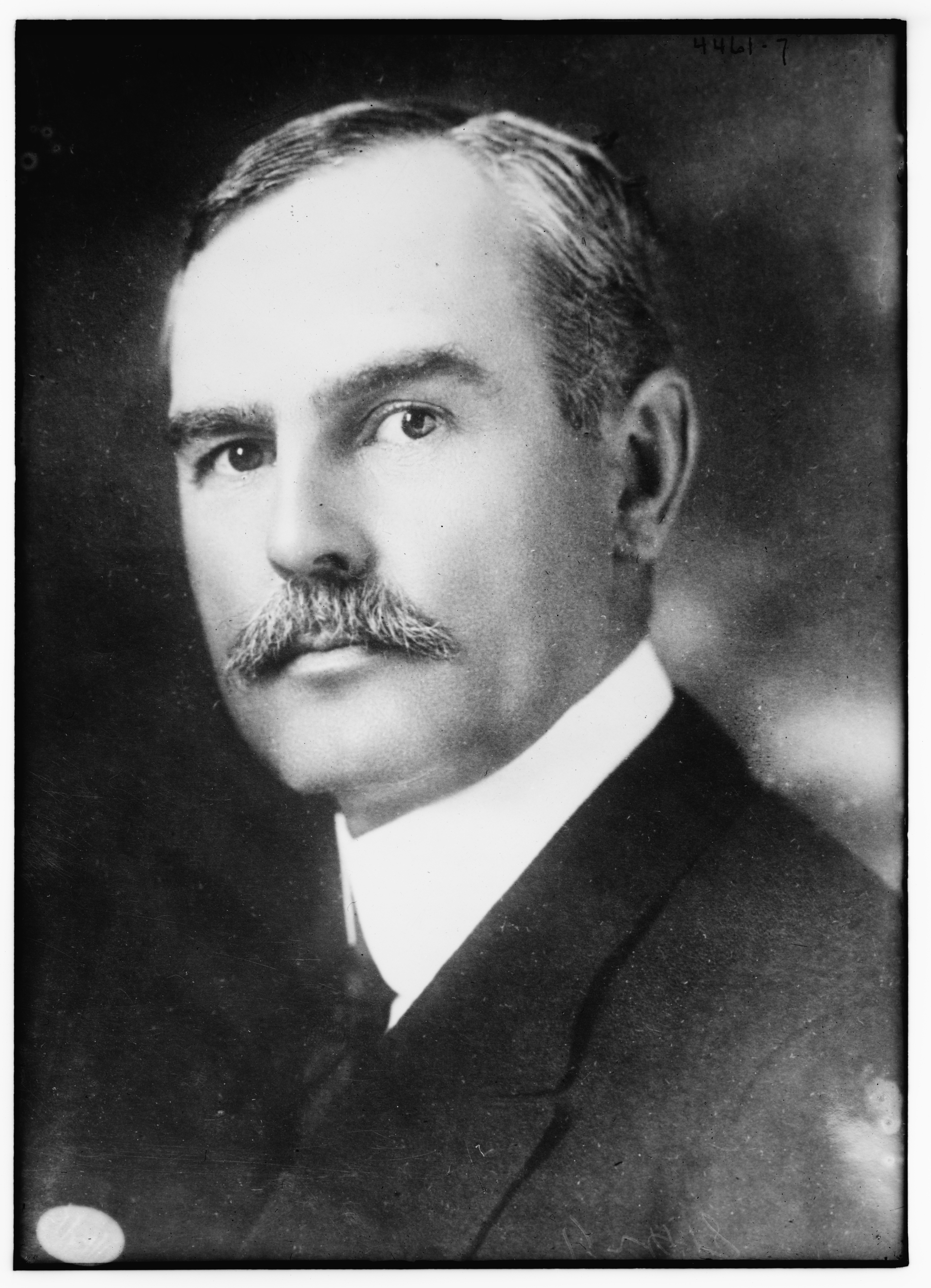
- Ryan in 1917

President of Anaconda Copper Mining Company

Personal details
- Born: November 10, 1864 Hancock, Michigan
- Died: February 11, 1933 (aged 68) Manhattan, New York City

John Denis Ryan (October 10, 1864 – February 11, 1933) was an American industrialist and copper mining magnate. He served as President of the Anaconda Copper Mining Company and was a founder of the Montana Power Company.

== Biography ==
Ryan was born on October 10, 1864, in Hancock, Michigan, in Copper Country. He began selling lubricating oil in the western American states from a base in Denver, Colorado. Relocating to Butte, Montana, he later became close to Margaret Daly, the widow of banking and mining magnate Marcus Daly, who had died in 1900, and he acquired an interest in 1901 in the Daly Bank and Trust Co. in Anaconda, becoming its president. As such, he was closely involved with the management of Mrs. Daly's fortune.

Marcus Daly had been heavily involved in copper mining, and was involved with a syndicate led by Standard Oil principals Henry H. Rogers and William Rockefeller which created a new company, Amalgamated Copper Mining Company, and acquired Daly's Anaconda Copper Co., with Daly retaining a financial interest.

Amalgamated was in competition with Copper Kings William A. Clark and especially F. Augustus Heinze. Clark initially sided with Heinze, but later sold his holdings to Amalgamated. Heinze's mines in Butte were consolidated in 1902 as the United Copper Company. Thus, no single organization was able to monopolize copper extraction in Montana. In addition, although Butte was then the most prolific copper-mining district in the world, Amalgamated could not control other copper-mining districts, such as those in Michigan, Arizona, and countries outside the United States. Ryan is reputed to have had exceptional negotiating skills. He convinced Heinze to walk away with abundant compensation.

Rogers and Rockefeller were then able to gain complete control of Butte's copper as they merged them all with Amalgamated. Ryan became its president, and was rewarded with significant package of Amalgamated shares. The "right hand" of John Ryan was Cornelius Kelley, a young attorney who soon was given the position of vice-president. The reorganized company was again named Anaconda, as it had been under Daly.

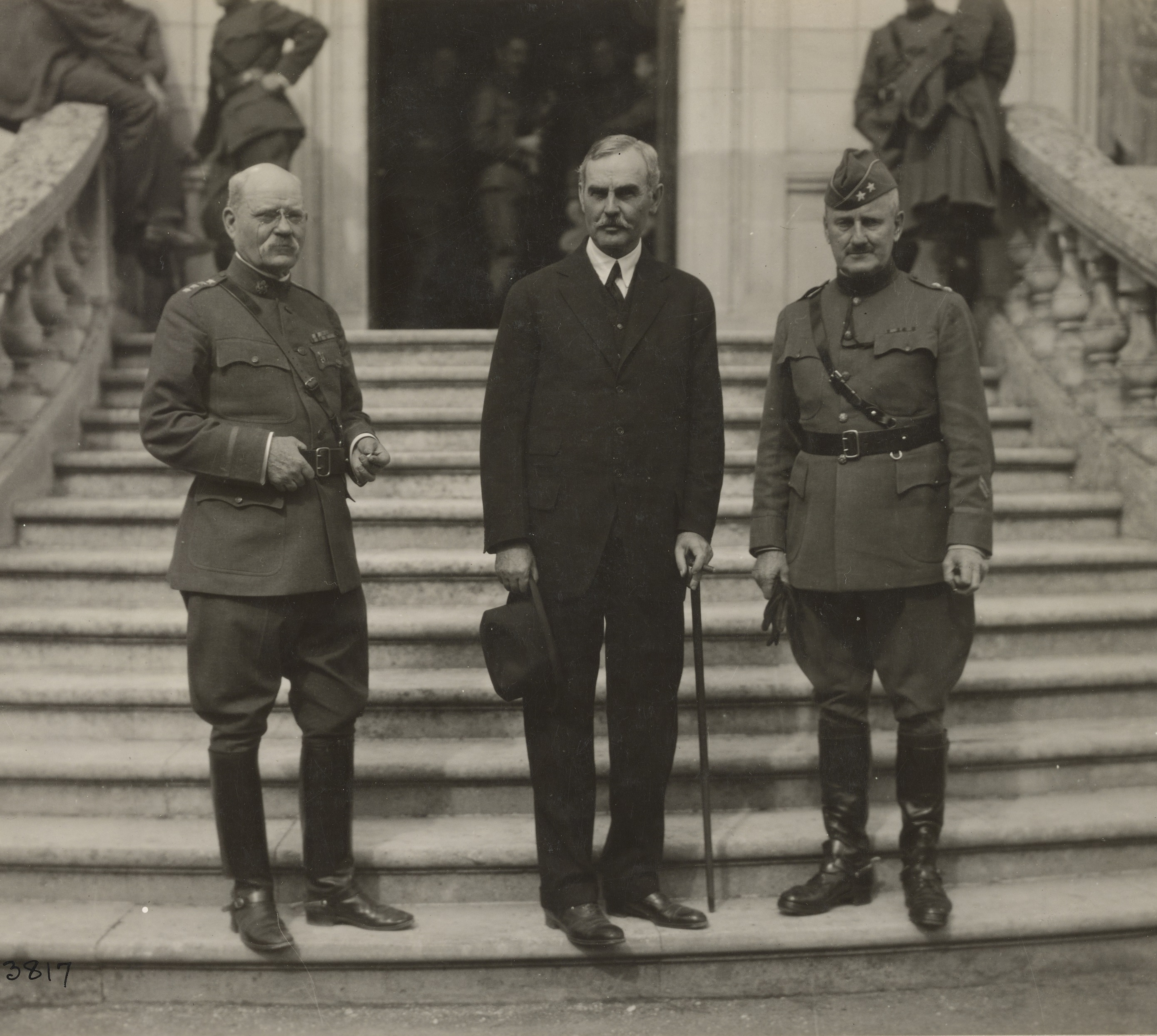
John Ryan as head of the Aircraft Board with US generals Tasker H. Bliss and James Harbord in Tours 1918

Henry Rogers died suddenly in 1909 of a stroke, but William Rockefeller brought in his son Percy Rockefeller to help with leadership. During World War I, Ryan took leave from Anaconda to work for the government and the American Red Cross. He was named Director General of the Red Cross' War Relief Program in 1917.

President Wilson appointed Ryan as new head of the Aircraft Production Board in April 1918, succeeding Howard Coffin. Shortly after the war had ended in late 1918, Ryan resigned and returned to private business.

Kelley served as President of Anaconda in the interim. After the War, Ryan assumed the position of chairman, with Kelley continuing as company president.

Under Percy Rockefeller, Ryan and Kelley, Anaconda acquired additional mining businesses outside the United States and by the 1920s, was expanding into new areas of activity which included manganese, zinc, aluminum, uranium and silver. It became the fourth largest company in the world.

He died on February 11, 1933, in Manhattan, New York City.

== Legacy ==
In 1928 Ryan and Percy Rockefeller aggressively speculated on Anaconda shares, causing them to go up at first (at which point they sold) and then to go down (at which point they bought them back). Known today as a "pump and dump", at the time it was not illegal, and was actually quite common. The prices, under the pressure of a "joint account" set up by Ryan and Rockefeller of nearly a million and a half shares of Anaconda Copper Company, fluctuated from $128 in December 1928 to $40 in March 1929.

Smaller investors were completely wiped out. The results are still considered one of the great fleecings in Wall Street history. The American Senate hearings concluded that those operations cost the public, at the very least, $150 million.

When the U.S. stock market crashed on October 29, 1929, Anaconda suffered serious financial setbacks. Moreover, at the same time, copper prices started going down dramatically. Things at Anaconda worsened as the Great Depression set in.

Ryan's Anaconda shares, once worth $175 each, had dropped to $4 at the bottom of the Great Depression. Ryan died in 1933, and was buried in a copper coffin. His protege', Cornelius Kelley, was named Chairman of Anaconda in 1940. In 1977, the company was purchased by Atlantic Richfield Corporation (Arco) and operations shut down permanently in 1982.

Ryan is credited with consolidation of several regional electrical generating companies into a single entity, Montana Power Company. This providing Anaconda with low-cost electricity for its mines and smelters. As president of Montana Power, he fostered electrification of the Butte, Anaconda and Pacific Railway and electrical improvements in the mines.

A 1933 Senate banking committee called the stock manipulating operations of Anaconda in the late 1920s one of the greatest frauds in American banking history and a leading cause of the 1930s depression.

John D. Ryan was named ninth in a listing of the 100 most important people in Montana of the 20th century. He was inducted posthumously into the National Mining Hall of Fame at Leadville, Colorado in 2005. Carrie Johnson, a historian, wrote a story about Ryan's rise to power which was published in Montana – The Magazine of Western History.
