= Panic of '07 =

Panic of '07 or Panic of 07 may refer to:

- Panic of 1907
- 2008 financial crisis
- Subprime mortgage crisis
