= Commercial & Financial Chronicle =

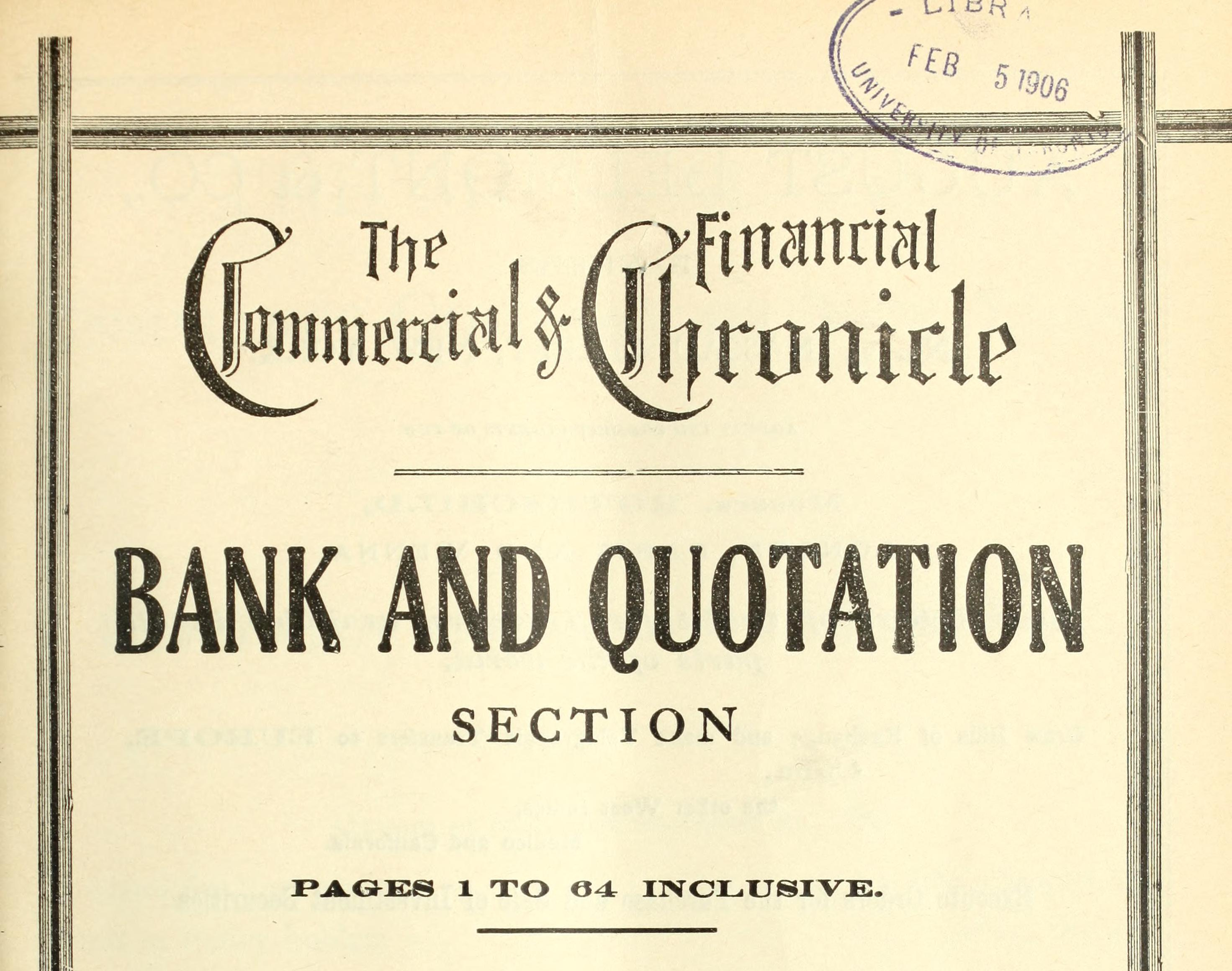
- Company type: Newspaper
- Industry: Newspaper
- Founded: 1865
- Defunct: 1987
- Fate: Folded in 1987 stock market crash
- Successor: Hunt's Merchant's Magazine and Commercial Review
- Headquarters: New York City
- Key people: F. Augustus Heinze
- Website: fraser.stlouisfed.org/title/?id=1339

The Commercial & Financial Chronicle was a business newspaper in the United States founded by William Buck Dana (1829–1910) in 1865. The first national business weekly in the United States, it was intended to be an American take on the popular business newspaper The Economist, founded in England in 1843.

The Chronicle continued the legacy begun by Hunt's Merchant's Magazine and Commercial Review, a monthly business magazine founded in 1839 by Freeman Hunt, which disappeared during the American Civil War. They are together in many library collections. Dana continued as editor of the Chronicle until his death in 1910.

The Commercial & Financial Chronicle never had the large subscriber base or influence of The Wall Street Journal or Barron's. In 1872, its circulation was around 4,000 and reached 26,000 by 1922. Data from the publication is, however, used by many economic historians, as it is one of the few sources available. Douglas Steeples, Dana's biographer, wrote that "one can scarcely reconstruct the business history of the United States between the Civil War and 1910 without immersing oneself in his paper. Even the most important series of business statistics published by the U.S. government, Historical Statistics of the United States [...], depends heavily on his work and that of the correspondents worldwide who contributed to the Chronicle."

In 1895, the William B. Dana Company sued rival Boston-based financial publisher Frank P. Bennett & Co., charging that the new financial supplement printed by Bennett's United States Investor consisted largely of The Chronicle's copyrighted content. "The Chronicle's injunction was granted [by the U.S. Circuit Court for the District of Massachusetts], protecting the copyright. The case is considered an important one because it has been deemed almost impossible heretofore to protect publications like those of The Chronicle," wrote the Library of Congress' Copyright Office in 1980.

The publication (little known or noticed at the time of its demise) ceased publication during the fallout of Black Monday and the stock market troubles of 1987.
