= Panic of 1907 =

Three-week financial crisis in the United States

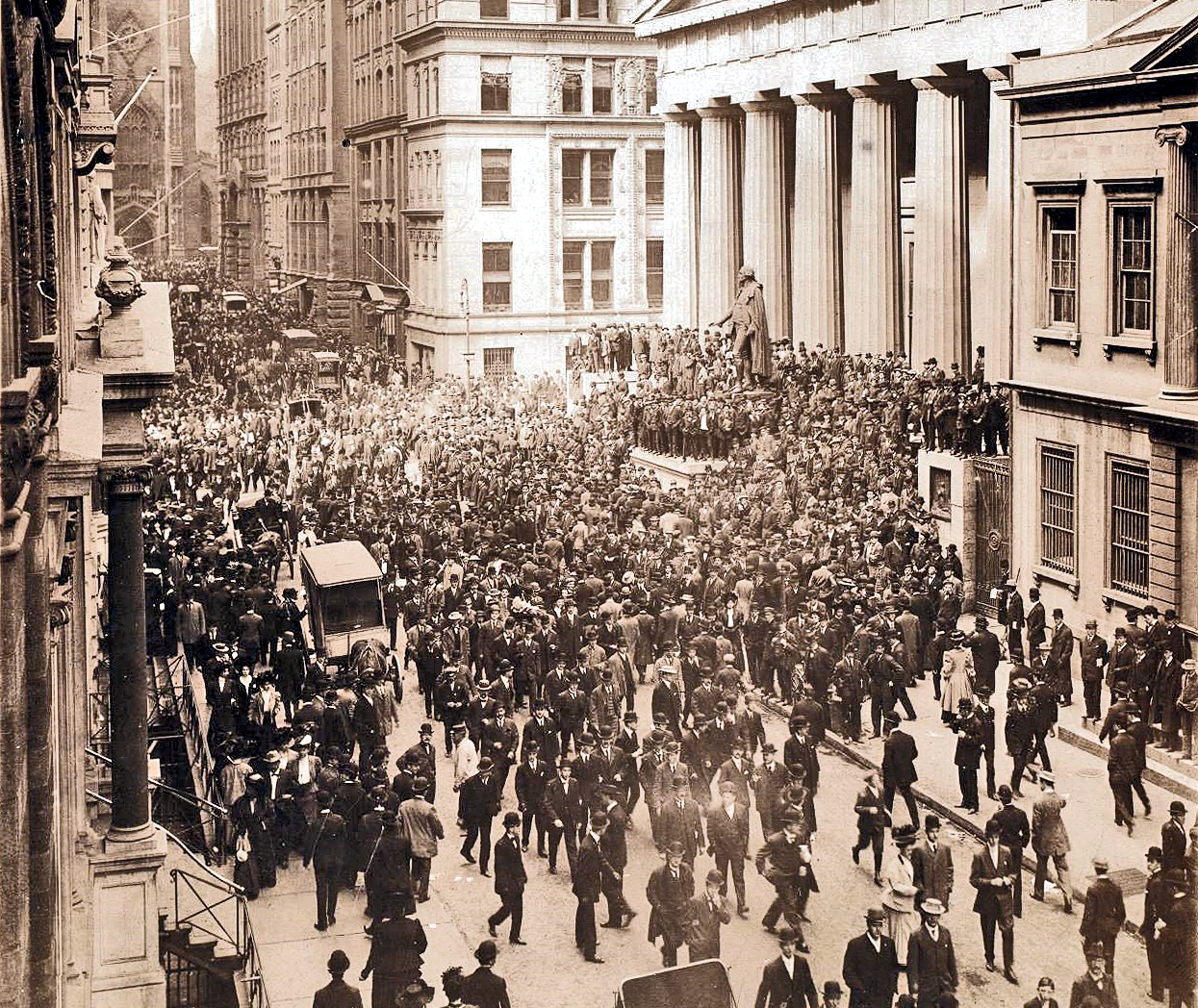
- Wall Street during the bank panic in October 1907. Federal Hall National Memorial, with its statue of George Washington, is seen on the right.
- Cause: Rampant economic speculation
- Participants: Theodore Roosevelt; John Pierpont Morgan
- Outcome: Establishment of the Federal Reserve

The Panic of 1907, also known as the 1907 Bankers' Panic or Knickerbocker Crisis, was a financial crisis that took place in the United States over a three-week period starting in mid-October, when the New York Stock Exchange suddenly fell almost 50% from its peak the previous year. The panic occurred during a time of economic recession, and there were numerous runs affecting banks and trust companies. The 1907 panic eventually spread throughout the nation when many state and local banks and businesses entered bankruptcy. The primary causes of the run included a retraction of market liquidity by a number of New York City banks and a loss of confidence among depositors, exacerbated by unregulated side bets at bucket shops.

The panic was triggered by the failed attempt in October 1907 to corner the market on stock of the United Copper Company. When the bid failed, banks that had lent money to the cornering scheme suffered runs that later spread to affiliated banks and trusts, leading a week later to the downfall of the Knickerbocker Trust Company, New York City's third-largest trust. The collapse of the Knickerbocker spread fear throughout the city's trusts as regional banks withdrew reserves from New York City banks. The panic then extended across the nation as vast numbers of people withdrew deposits from their regional banks, causing the 8th-largest decline in U.S. stock market history.

The panic might have deepened if not for the intervention of financier J. P. Morgan, who pledged large sums of his own money and convinced other New York bankers to do the same to shore up the banking system. That highlighted the limitations of the US Independent Treasury system, which managed the nation's money supply but was unable to inject sufficient liquidity back into the market. By November, the financial contagion had largely ended, only to be replaced by a further crisis due to the heavy borrowing of a large brokerage firm using the stock of Tennessee Coal, Iron and Railroad Company (TC&I) as collateral. Collapse of TC&I's stock price was averted by an emergency takeover by Morgan's U.S. Steel Corporation, a move approved by the trust-busting President Theodore Roosevelt. The following year, Senator Nelson W. Aldrich, a leading Republican, established and chaired a commission to investigate the crisis and propose future solutions, which led to the creation of the Federal Reserve System.

== Economic conditions ==
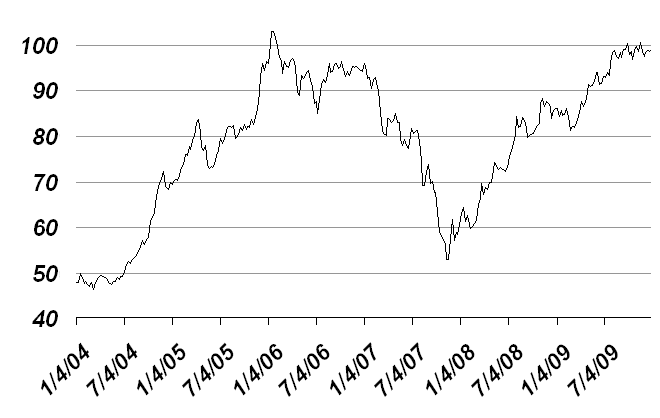
Dow Jones Industrial Average 1904–1910. The bottom of 53 was recorded November 15, 1907.

When United States President Andrew Jackson allowed the charter of the Second Bank of the United States to expire in 1836, the U.S. was without any sort of central bank, and the money supply in New York City fluctuated with the country's annual agricultural cycle. Each autumn, money flowed out of the city as harvests were purchased and—in an effort to attract money back—interest rates were raised. Foreign investors then sent their money to New York to take advantage of the higher rates. From the January 1906 Dow Jones Industrial Average high of 103, the market began a modest correction that would continue throughout the year. The April 1906 earthquake that devastated San Francisco contributed to the market instability, prompting an even greater flood of money from New York to San Francisco to aid reconstruction. A further stress on the money supply occurred in late 1906, when the Bank of England raised its interest rates, partly in response to UK insurance companies paying out so much to US policyholders, and more funds remained in London than expected. From their peak in January, stock prices declined 18% by July 1906. By late September, stocks had recovered about half of their losses.

The Hepburn Act, which gave the Interstate Commerce Commission (ICC) the power to set maximum railroad rates, became law in July 1906. This depreciated the value of railroad securities. Between September 1906 and March 1907, the stock market slid, losing 7.7% of its capitalization. Between March 9 and 26, stocks fell a further 9.8%. (This March collapse is sometimes referred to as a "rich man's panic".) The economy remained volatile through the summer. A number of shocks hit the system: the stock of Union Pacific—among the most common stocks used as collateral—fell 50 points; that June an offering of New York City bonds failed; in July the copper market collapsed; in August the Standard Oil Company was fined $29 million for antitrust violations. In the first nine months of 1907, stocks were lower by 24.4%.

On July 27, The Commercial & Financial Chronicle noted that "the market keeps unstable ... no sooner are these signs of new life in evidence than something like a suggestion of a new outflow of gold to Paris sends a tremble all through the list, and the gain in values and hope is gone". Several bank runs occurred outside the US in 1907: in Egypt in April and May; in Japan in May and June; in Germany and Chile in early October. The fall season was always a vulnerable time for the banking system—combined with the roiled stock market, even a small shock could have grave repercussions.

== The panic ==
Timeline of panic in New York City
Monday, October 14	Otto Heinze begins purchasing to corner the stock of United Copper.
Wednesday, October 16	Heinze's corner fails spectacularly. Heinze's brokerage house, Gross & Kleeberg is forced to close. This is the date traditionally cited as when the corner failed.
Thursday, October 17	The Exchange suspends Otto Heinze and Company. The State Savings Bank of Butte, Montana, owned by Augustus Heinze announces it is insolvent. Augustus is forced to resign from Mercantile National Bank. Runs begin at Augustus' and his associate Charles W. Morse's banks.
Sunday, October 20	The New York Clearing House forces Augustus and Morse to resign from all their banking interests.
Monday, October 21	Charles T. Barney is forced to resign from the Knickerbocker Trust Company because of his ties to Morse and Heinze. The National Bank of Commerce says it will no longer serve as clearing house.
Tuesday, October 22	A bank run forces the Knickerbocker to suspend operations.
Wednesday, October 23	J.P. Morgan persuades other trust company presidents to provide liquidity to the Trust Company of America, staving off its collapse.
Thursday, October 24	Treasury Secretary George Cortelyou agrees to deposit Federal money in New York banks. Morgan persuades bank presidents to provide $23 million to the New York Stock Exchange to prevent an early closure.
Friday October 25	Crisis is again narrowly averted at the Exchange.
Sunday, October 27	The City of New York tells Morgan associate George Perkins that if they cannot raise $20–30 million by November 1, the city will be insolvent.
Tuesday, October 29	Morgan purchased $30 million in city bonds, discreetly averting bankruptcy for the city.
Saturday, November 2	Moore & Schley, a major brokerage, nears collapse because its loans were backed by the Tennessee Coal, Iron & Railroad Company (TC&I), a stock whose value is uncertain. A proposal is made for U.S. Steel to purchase TC&I.
Sunday, November 3	A plan is finalized for U.S. Steel to take over TC&I.
Monday, November 4	President Theodore Roosevelt approves U.S. Steel's takeover of TC&I, despite anticompetitive concerns.
Tuesday, November 5	Markets are closed for Election Day (no federal elections were actually held this year).

=== Cornering United Copper ===
The 1907 panic began with a stock manipulation scheme to corner the market in F. Augustus Heinze's United Copper Company. Heinze had made a fortune as a copper magnate in Butte, Montana. In 1906 he moved to New York City, where he formed a close relationship with notorious Wall Street banker Charles W. Morse. Morse had once successfully cornered New York City's ice market, and together with Heinze gained control of many banks—the pair served on the boards of at least six national banks, ten state banks, five trust companies and four insurance firms.

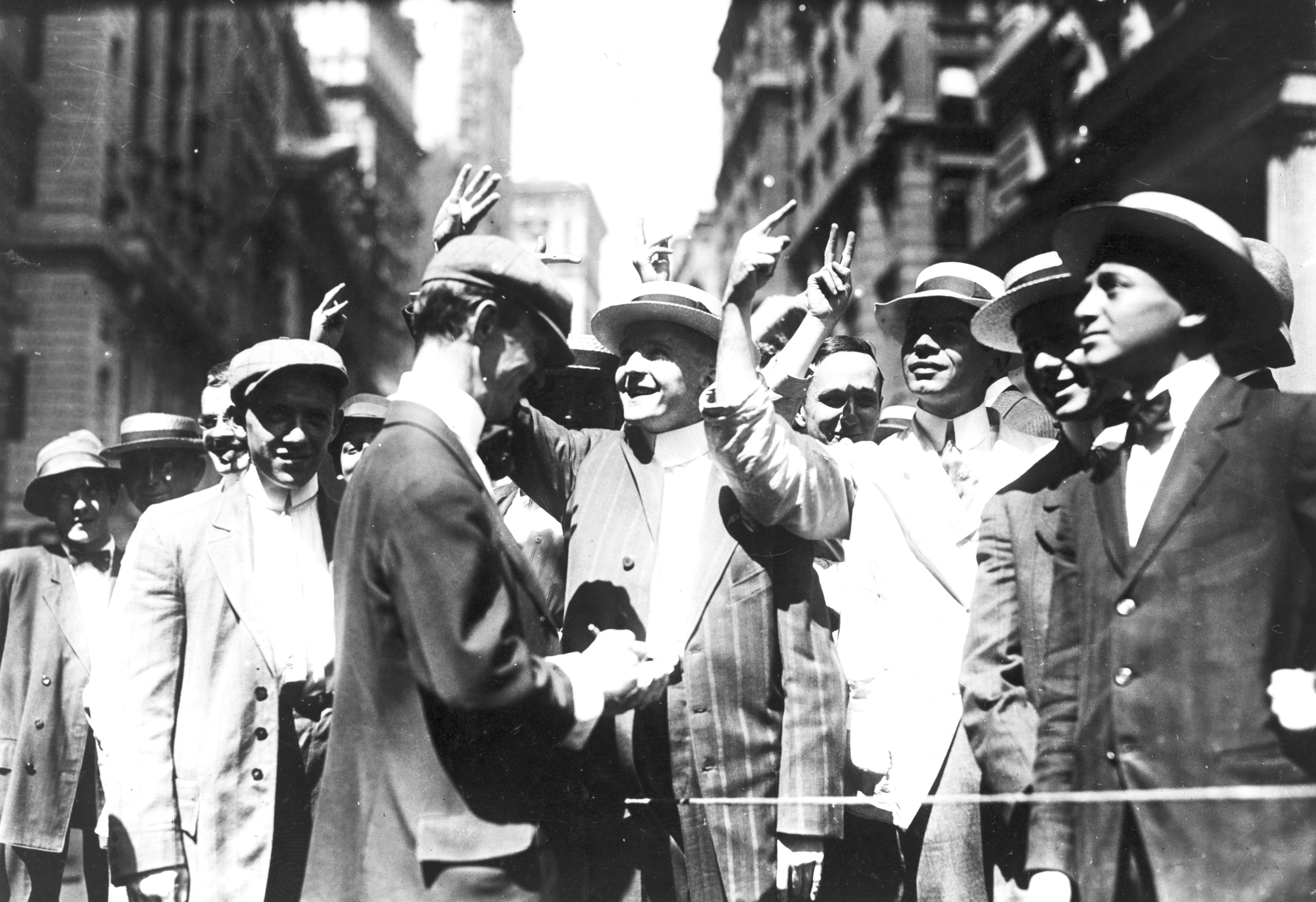
The curb outside the New York Stock Exchange's building, where panic began. (Note: This curb market later became the American Stock Exchange.)

Augustus' brother, Otto, devised the scheme to corner United Copper, believing that the Heinze family already controlled a majority of the company. He also believed that a significant number of the Heinzes' shares had been borrowed, and sold short, by speculators betting that the stock price would drop, and that they could thus repurchase the borrowed shares cheaply, pocketing the difference. Otto proposed a short squeeze, in which the Heinzes would aggressively purchase as many remaining shares as possible, and then force the short sellers to pay for their borrowed shares. The aggressive purchasing would drive up the share price, and, being unable to find shares elsewhere, the short sellers would have no option but to turn to the Heinzes, who could then name their price.

To finance the scheme, Otto, Augustus and Charles Morse met with Charles T. Barney, president of the city's third-largest trust, the Knickerbocker Trust Company. Barney had provided financing for previous Morse schemes. Morse, however, cautioned Otto that in order to attempt the squeeze, Otto needed much more money than Barney had, and Barney declined to provide funding. Otto decided to attempt the corner anyway. On Monday, October 14, he began aggressively purchasing shares of United Copper, which rose in one day from $39 to $52 per share. On Tuesday (Oct. 15), he issued the call for short sellers to return the borrowed stock. The share price rose to nearly $60, but the short sellers were able to find plenty of United Copper shares from sources other than the Heinzes. Otto had misread the market, and the share price of United Copper began to collapse.

The stock closed at $30 on Tuesday and fell to $10 by Wednesday (Oct. 16). Otto Heinze was ruined. The stock of United Copper was traded outside the hall of the New York Stock Exchange, literally an outdoor market "on the curb" (this curb market would later become the American Stock Exchange). After the crash, The Wall Street Journal reported, "Never has there been such wild scenes on the Curb, so say the oldest veterans of the outside market".

=== Contagion ===
The failure of the corner left Otto unable to meet his obligations and sent his brokerage house, Gross & Kleeberg, into bankruptcy. On Thursday, October 17, the New York Stock Exchange suspended Otto's trading privileges. As a result of United Copper's collapse, the State Savings Bank of Butte, Montana (owned by F. Augustus Heinze) announced its insolvency. The Montana bank had held United Copper stock as collateral against some of its lending and had been a correspondent bank for the Mercantile National Bank in New York City, of which F. Augustus Heinze was then president.

F. Augustus Heinze's association with the corner and the insolvent State Savings Bank proved too much for the board of the Mercantile to accept. Although they forced him to resign before lunch time, by then it was too late. As news of the collapse spread, depositors rushed en masse to withdraw money from the Mercantile National Bank. The Mercantile had enough capital to withstand a few days of withdrawals, but depositors began to pull cash from the banks of the Heinzes' associate Charles W. Morse. Runs occurred at Morse's National Bank of North America and the New Amsterdam National. Afraid of the impact the tainted reputations of Augustus Heinze and Morse could have on the banking system, the New York Clearing House (a consortium of the city's banks) forced Morse and Heinze to resign all banking interests. By the weekend after the failed corner, there was not yet systemic panic. Funds were withdrawn from Heinze-associated banks, only to be deposited with other banks in the city.

A week later many regional stock exchanges throughout the nation were closing or limiting trading. For example, the Pittsburgh city's stock exchange closed for three months starting on October 23, 1907.

=== Panic hits the trusts ===
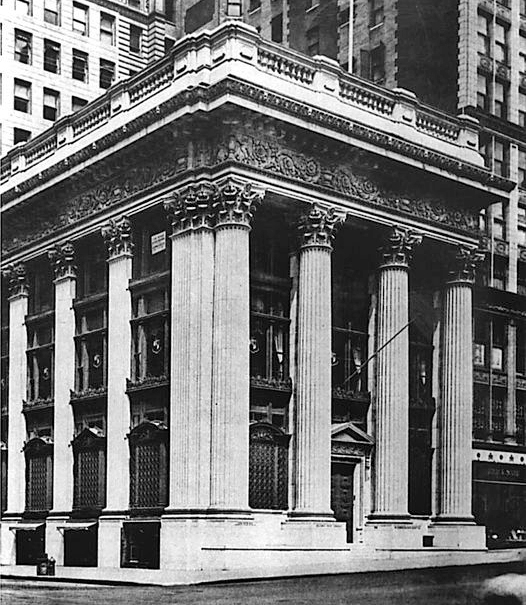
Headquarters of the Knickerbocker Trust Company at the northwest corner of Fifth Avenue and 34th Street

In the early 1900s, trust companies were booming; in the decade before 1907, their assets had grown by 244%. During the same period, national bank assets grew by 97%, while state banks in New York increased by 82%. The leaders of the high-flying trusts were mainly prominent members of New York's financial and social circles. One of the most respected was Charles T. Barney, whose late father-in-law William Collins Whitney was a famous financier. Barney's Knickerbocker Trust Company was the third-largest trust in New York.

Because of past association with Charles W. Morse and F. Augustus Heinze, on Monday, October 21, the board of the Knickerbocker asked that Barney resign (depositors may have first begun to pull deposits from the Knickerbocker on October 18, prompting the concern). That day, the National Bank of Commerce where J.P. Morgan was a dominant factor, announced it would not serve as clearing house for the Knickerbocker. On October 22, the Knickerbocker faced a classic bank run. From the bank's opening, the crowd grew. As The New York Times reported, "as fast as a depositor went out of the place ten people and more came asking for their money [and the police] were asked to send some men to keep order". Two van loads of notes were quickly unloaded, yet even this failed to calm the panic stricken depositors. Directors and other officials of the Trust forced their way through the crowd, assuring them that everyone would be paid. In less than three hours, $8 million (equivalent to $276.4 million in 2025) was withdrawn from the Knickerbocker. Shortly after noon it was forced to suspend operations.

As news spread, other banks and trust companies were reluctant to lend any money. The interest rates on loans to brokers at the stock exchange soared to 70% and, with brokers unable to get money, stock prices fell to a low not seen since December 1900. The panic quickly spread to two other large trusts, Trust Company of America and Lincoln Trust Company. By Thursday, October 24, a chain of failures littered the street: Twelfth Ward Bank, Empire City Savings Bank, Hamilton Bank of New York, First National Bank of Brooklyn, International Trust Company of New York, Williamsburg Trust Company of Brooklyn, Borough Bank of Brooklyn, Jenkins Trust Company of Brooklyn and the Union Trust Company of Providence.

=== J. P. Morgan ===
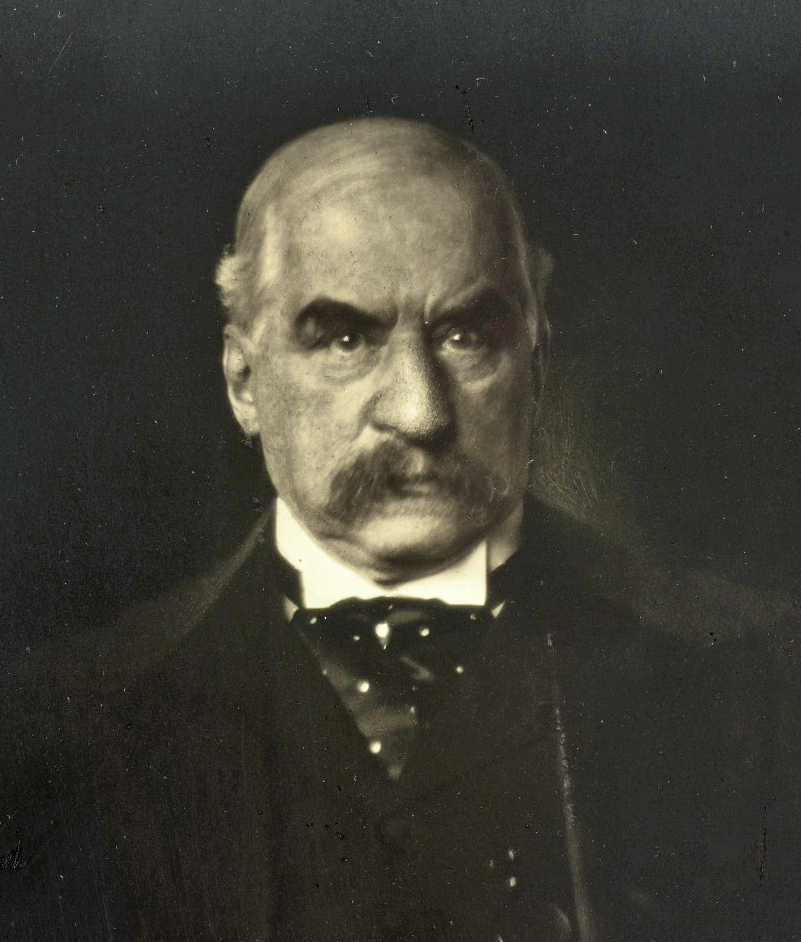
J.P. Morgan, the dominant banker in New York City. (Note: He had rescued the U.S. Treasury during the Panic of 1893.)

When the chaos began to shake the confidence of New York's banks, the city's most famous banker was out of town. J. P. Morgan, the eponymous president of J.P. Morgan & Co., was attending a church convention in Richmond, Virginia. Morgan was not only the city's wealthiest and most well-connected banker, but he had experience with other similar financial crises—he had helped rescue the U.S. Treasury during the Panic of 1893. As news of the crisis gathered, Morgan returned to Wall Street from his convention late on the night of Saturday, October 19. The following morning, the library of Morgan's brownstone at Madison Avenue and 36th St. had become a revolving door of New York City bank and trust company presidents arriving to share information about (and seek help surviving) the impending crisis.

Morgan and his associates examined the books of the Knickerbocker Trust and decided it was insolvent, so they did not intervene to stop the run. Its failure, however, triggered runs on even healthy trusts, prompting Morgan to take charge of the rescue operation. On the afternoon of Tuesday, October 22, the president of the Trust Company of America asked Morgan for assistance. That evening Morgan conferred with George F. Baker, the president of First National Bank, James Stillman of the National City Bank of New York (the ancestor of Citibank), and the United States Secretary of the Treasury, George B. Cortelyou. Cortelyou said that he was ready to deposit government money in the banks to help shore up their deposits. After an overnight audit of the Trust Company of America showed the institution to be sound, on Wednesday afternoon Morgan declared, "This is the place to stop the trouble, then."

As a run began on the Trust Company of America, Morgan worked with Stillman and Baker to liquidate the company's assets to allow the bank to pay depositors. The bank survived to the close of business, but Morgan knew that additional money would be needed to keep it solvent through the following day. That night he assembled the presidents of the other trust companies and held them in a meeting until midnight, when they agreed to provide loans of $8.25 million to allow the Trust Company of America to stay open the next day. On Thursday morning Cortelyou deposited around $25 million into a number of New York banks. John D. Rockefeller, the wealthiest man in the United States, deposited a further $10 million in Stillman's National City Bank. Rockefeller's massive deposit left the National City Bank with the deepest reserves of any bank in the city. To instill public confidence, Rockefeller phoned Melville Stone, the manager of the Associated Press, and told him that he would pledge half of his wealth to maintain U.S. credit.

=== Stock exchange nears collapse ===
Despite the infusion of cash, the banks of New York were reluctant to make the short-term loans they typically provided to facilitate daily stock trades. Prices on the exchange began to crash, owing to the lack of funds to finance purchases. At 1:30 p.m. Thursday, October 24, Ransom Thomas, the president of the New York Stock Exchange, rushed to Morgan's offices to tell him that he would have to close the exchange early. Morgan was emphatic that an early close of the exchange would be catastrophic.

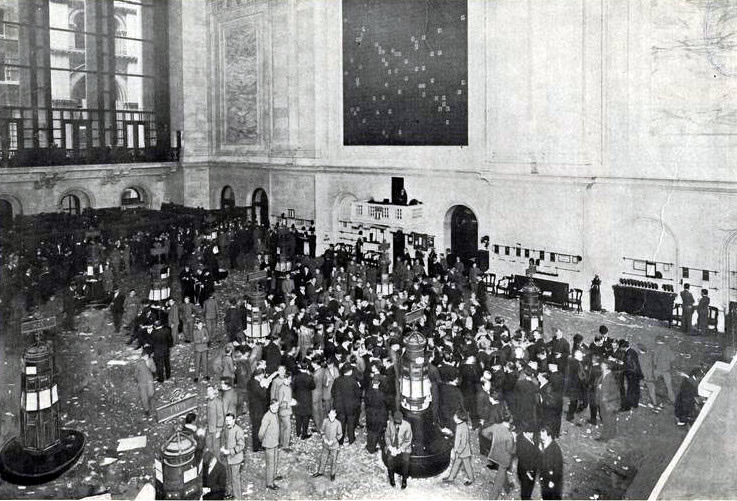
Floor of the New York Stock Exchange (pictured in 1908) (Note: Here trading nearly collapsed at the end of October as banks were reluctant to lend.)

Morgan summoned the presidents of the city's banks to his office. They started to arrive at 2 p.m.; Morgan informed them that as many as 50 stock exchange houses would fail unless $25 million was raised in 10 minutes. By 2:16 p.m., 14 bank presidents had pledged $23.6 million to keep the stock exchange afloat. The money reached the market at 2:30 p.m., in time to finish the day's trading, and by the 3 o'clock market close, $19 million had been loaned out. Disaster was averted. Morgan usually eschewed the press, but as he left his offices that night he made a statement to reporters: "If people will keep their money in the banks, everything will be all right".

Friday, however, saw more panic on the exchange. Morgan again approached the bank presidents, but this time was only able to convince them to pledge $9.7 million. In order for this money to keep the exchange open, Morgan decided the money could not be used for margin sales. The volume of trading on Friday was two-thirds that of Thursday. The markets again narrowly made it to the closing bell.

=== Crisis of confidence ===
Morgan, Stillman, Baker and the other city bankers were unable to pool money indefinitely. Even the U.S. Treasury was low on funds. Public confidence needed to be restored, and on Friday evening the bankers formed two committees—one to persuade the clergy to calm their congregations on Sunday, and a second to explain to the press the various aspects of the financial rescue package. Europe's most famous banker, Lord Rothschild, sent word of his "admiration and respect" for Morgan. In an attempt to gather confidence, the Treasury Secretary Cortelyou agreed that if he returned to Washington it would send a signal to Wall Street that the worst had passed.

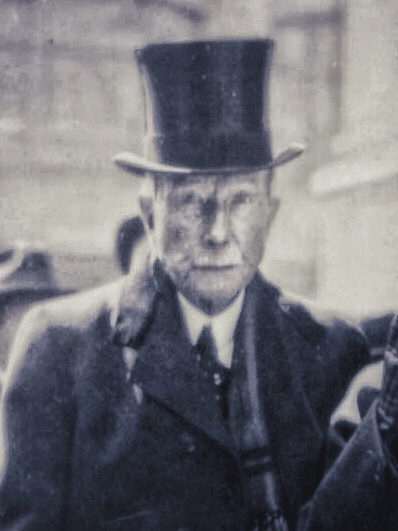
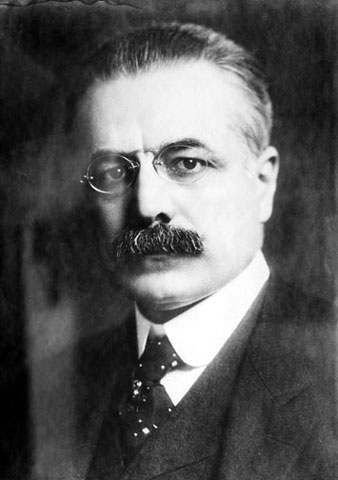
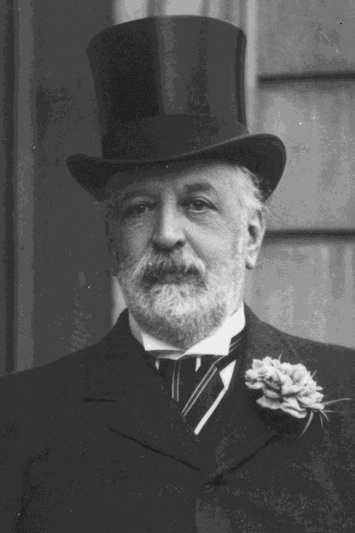
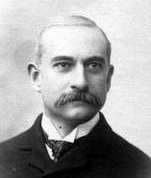
John D. Rockefeller, George B. Cortelyou, Lord Rothschild and James Stillman, some of the best-known names on Wall Street. They tried to restore confidence in the economy.

To ensure a free flow of funds on Monday, the New York Clearing House issued $100 million in loan certificates to be traded between banks to settle balances, allowing them to retain cash reserves for depositors. Reassured both by the clergy and the newspapers, and with bank balance sheets flush with cash, a sense of order returned to New York that Monday.

Unbeknownst to Wall Street, a new crisis was being averted in the background. On Sunday, Morgan's associate, George Perkins, was informed that the City of New York required at least $20 million by November 1 or it would go bankrupt. The city tried to raise money through a standard bond issue, but failed to gather enough financing. On Monday and again on Tuesday, New York Mayor George McClellan approached Morgan for assistance. In an effort to avoid the disastrous signal that a New York City bankruptcy would send, Morgan contracted to purchase $30 million worth of city bonds.

=== Drama at the library ===
Although calm was largely restored in New York by Saturday, November 2, yet another crisis loomed. One of the exchange's largest brokerage firms, Moore & Schley, was heavily in debt and in danger of collapse. The firm had borrowed heavily, using shares of the Tennessee Coal, Iron and Railroad Company (TC&I) as collateral. With the value of the thinly traded stock falling, many banks would likely call the loans of Moore & Schley on Monday and force an en masse liquidation of the firm's stock. If that occurred it would send TC&I shares plummeting, devastating Moore and Schley and triggering further panic in the market.

To avert the collapse of Moore & Schley, Morgan called an emergency conference at his library Saturday morning. A proposal was made that the U.S. Steel Corporation, a company Morgan had helped form through the merger of the steel companies of Andrew Carnegie and Elbert Gary, would acquire TC&I. This would effectively save Moore & Schley and avert the crisis. The executives and board of U.S. Steel studied the situation and offered to either loan Moore & Schley $5 million, or buy TC&I for $90 a share. By 7 p.m. an agreement had not been reached and the meeting adjourned.

By then, Morgan was drawn into another situation. There was deep concern that the Trust Company of America and the Lincoln Trust might fail to open on Monday due to continuing runs by depositors. On Saturday evening 40–50 bankers gathered at the library to discuss the crisis, with the clearing-house bank presidents in the East room and the trust company executives in the West room. Morgan and those dealing with the Moore & Schley situation moved to the librarian's office. There Morgan told his counselors that he would agree to help shore up Moore & Schley only if the trust companies would work together to bail out their weakest brethren. The discussion among the bankers continued late into Saturday night but without much progress. Around midnight, J. P. Morgan informed a leader of the trust company presidents that keeping Moore & Schley afloat would require $25 million, and he would not commit those funds unless the problems with the trust companies could also be resolved. The trust company executives understood they would not receive further help from Morgan; they would have to finance any bailout of the two struggling trust companies.

At 3 a.m. about 120 bank and trust company officials assembled to hear a full report on the status of the failing trust companies. While the Trust Company of America was barely solvent, the Lincoln Trust Company was probably $1 million short of what it needed to cover depositor accounts. As discussion ensued, the bankers realized that Morgan had locked them in the library and pocketed the key to force a solution, the sort of strong-arm tactic he had been known to use in the past. Morgan then entered the talks and advised the trust companies that they must provide a loan of $25 million to save the weaker institutions. The trust presidents were still reluctant to act, but Morgan informed them that if they did not it would lead to a complete collapse of the banking system. Through his considerable influence, at about 4:45 a.m. he persuaded the unofficial leader of the trust companies to sign the agreement, and the remainder of the bankers followed. Having received these commitments, Morgan allowed the bankers to go home.

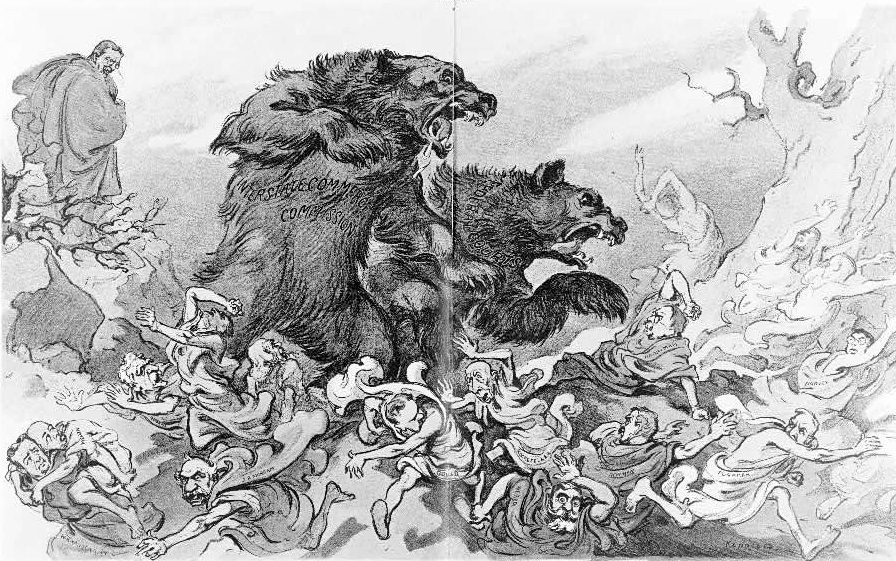
Cartoon of Theodore Roosevelt attacking Wall Street (Note: He is commanding two bears symbolize "Interstate Commerce Commission" and "Federal Courts". From Puck, May 8, 1907.)

On Sunday afternoon and into the evening, Morgan, Perkins, Baker and Stillman, along with U.S. Steel's Gary and Henry Clay Frick, worked at the library to finalize the deal for U.S. Steel to buy TC&I and by Sunday night had a plan for acquisition. But one obstacle remained: the anti-trust crusading President Theodore Roosevelt, who had made breaking up monopolies a focus of his presidency.

Frick and Gary traveled overnight by train to the White House to implore Roosevelt to set aside the application of the Sherman Antitrust Act and allow—before the market opened—a company that already held a 60% share of the steel market to make a large acquisition. Roosevelt's secretary refused to see them, but Frick and Gary convinced James Rudolph Garfield, the Secretary of the Interior, to bypass the secretary and arrange a meeting with the president. With less than an hour before the Stock Exchange opened, Roosevelt and Secretary of State Elihu Root began to review the proposed takeover and appreciate the crash likely to ensue if the merger was not approved. Roosevelt relented; he later recalled of the meeting, "It was necessary for me to decide on the instant before the Stock Exchange opened, for the situation in New York was such that any hour might be vital. I do not believe that anyone could justly criticize me for saying that I would not feel like objecting to the purchase under those circumstances". When news reached New York, confidence soared. The Commercial & Financial Chronicle reported that "the relief furnished by this transaction was instant and far-reaching". The final crisis of the panic had been averted.

== Aftermath ==
The panic of 1907 occurred during a lengthy economic contraction, measured by the National Bureau of Economic Research as occurring between May 1907 and June 1908. The interrelated contraction, bank panic, and falling stock market resulted in significant economic disruption. Industrial production dropped further than after any previous bank run, and 1907 saw the second-highest volume of bankruptcies to that date. Production fell by 11% and imports by 26%, while unemployment rose to 8% from under 3%. Immigration dropped to 750,000 people in 1909, from 1.2 million two years earlier.

Since the end of the Civil War, the United States had experienced panics of varying severity. Economists Charles Calomiris and Gary Gorton rate the worst panics as those leading to widespread bank suspensions: the panics of 1873, 1893, and 1907, and a suspension in 1914. Widespread suspensions were forestalled through coordinated actions during the 1884 and 1890 panics. A bank crisis in 1896, in which there was a perceived need for coordination, is also sometimes classified as a panic.

The frequency of crises and the severity of the 1907 panic added to concern about the outsized role of J.P. Morgan and renewed impetus toward a national debate on reform. In May 1908, Congress passed the Aldrich–Vreeland Act, which established the National Monetary Commission to investigate the panic and to propose legislation to regulate banking.

=== Central bank ===
A significant difference between the European and U.S. banking systems was the absence of a central bank in the United States. European states were able to extend the supply of money during periods of low cash reserves. The belief that the U.S. economy was vulnerable without a central bank was not new. Early in 1907, banker Jacob Schiff of Kuhn, Loeb & Co. warned in a speech to the New York Chamber of Commerce that "unless we have a central bank with adequate control of credit resources, this country is going to undergo the most severe and far reaching money panic in its history".

In 1908: Frank A. Vanderlip led a U.S. business delegation to Japan to meet with Japanese financial leaders including Taka Kawada, Shibusawa Eiichi and his son Shibusawa Masao, also founding members of Mitsui & Co., Takuma Dan & Takamine Mitsui with the goal of allying with Japan to resolve the Panic of 1907 and the unstable U.S. stock market.

Aldrich convened a secret conference with a number of the nation's leading financiers at the Jekyll Island Club, off the coast of Georgia, to discuss monetary policy and the banking system in November 1910. Aldrich and A. P. Andrew (Assistant Secretary of the Treasury Department), Paul Warburg (representing Kuhn, Loeb & Co.), Frank A. Vanderlip (James Stillman's successor as president of the National City Bank of New York), Henry P. Davison (senior partner of J. P. Morgan Company), Charles D. Norton (president of the Morgan-dominated First National Bank of New York), and Benjamin Strong (representing J. P. Morgan), produced a design for a "National Reserve Bank".

The final report of the National Monetary Commission was published on January 11, 1911. For nearly two years legislators debated the proposal, and it was not until December 23, 1913, that Congress passed the Federal Reserve Act. President Woodrow Wilson signed the legislation immediately, and the legislation was enacted on the same day, creating the Federal Reserve System. Charles Hamlin became the Fed's first chairman, and none other than Morgan's deputy Benjamin Strong became president of the Federal Reserve Bank of New York, the most important regional bank, with a permanent seat on the Federal Open Market Committee.

=== Pujo Committee ===
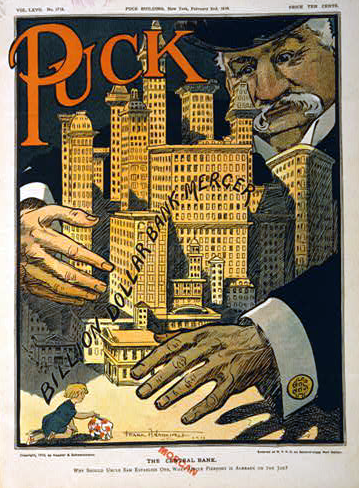
Cartoon of J. P. Morgan seizing control of banks. (Note: A February 2, 1910, editorial cartoon in Puck titled: "The Central Bank—Why should Uncle Sam establish one, when Uncle Pierpont is already on the job?")

Although Morgan was briefly seen as a hero, widespread fears concerning plutocracy and concentrated wealth soon eroded this view. Morgan's bank had survived, but the trust companies that were a growing rival to traditional banks were badly damaged. Some analysts believed that the panic had been engineered to damage confidence in trust companies so that banks would benefit. Others believed Morgan took advantage of the panic to allow his U.S. Steel company to acquire TC&I. Although Morgan lost $21 million in the panic, and the significance of the role he played in staving off worse disaster is undisputed, he also became the focus of intense scrutiny and criticism.

The chair of the House Committee on Banking and Currency, Representative Arsène Pujo (D–La. 7th), convened a special committee to investigate a "money trust", the de facto monopoly of Morgan and New York's other most powerful bankers. The committee issued a scathing report on the banking trade and found that the officers of J. P. Morgan & Co. also sat on the boards of directors of 112 corporations with a market capitalization of $22.5 billion (the total capitalization of the New York Stock Exchange was then estimated at $26.5 billion).

Although suffering ill health, J. P. Morgan testified before the Pujo Committee and faced several days of questioning from Samuel Untermyer. Untermyer and Morgan's famous exchange on the fundamentally psychological nature of banking—that it is an industry built on trust—is often quoted in business articles:

Untermyer: Is not commercial credit based primarily upon money or property?
Morgan: No, sir. The first thing is character.
Untermyer: Before money or property?
Morgan: Before money or anything else. Money cannot buy it … a man I do not trust could not get money from me on all the bonds in Christendom.

Associates of Morgan blamed his continued physical decline on the hearings. He became ill in February and died on March 31, 1913, nine months before the Federal Reserve officially replaced the "money trust" as lender of last resort.

== See also ==
- Mercantile National Bank Building
- A Central Bank as a Menace to Liberty, by George H. Earle Jr.—Philadelphia lawyer and businessman. (1908)

== Bibliography ==
- Bruner, Robert F.; Carr, Sean D. (2007), The Panic of 1907: Lessons Learned from the Market's Perfect Storm, Hoboken, New Jersey: John Wiley & Sons, ISBN 978-0-470-15263-8
- Bruner, Robert F. and Sean Carr, "The Panic of 1907, (Darden Case No. UVA-G-0619, U of Virginia – Darden School of Business, (2009)
- Calomiris, Charles W.; Gorton, Gary (1992), "The Origins of Banking Panics: Models, Facts and Bank Regulation", in Hubbard, R. Glenn (ed.), Financial Markets and Financial Crises, Chicago: University of Chicago Press, ISBN 978-0-226-35588-7
- Caporale, Tony; McKiernan, Barbara (1998), "Interest Rate Uncertainty and the Founding of the Federal Reserve", The Journal of Economic History, 58 (4): 1110–17, doi:10.1017/S0022050700021756, S2CID 154320520
- Carosso, Vincent P. (1987), The Morgans: Private International Bankers, 1854–1913, Cambridge: Harvard University Press, ISBN 978-0-674-58729-8
- Chernow, Ron (1990), The House of Morgan: An American Banking Dynasty and the Rise of Modern Finance, New York: Grove Press, ISBN 978-0-8021-3829-3
- Chernow, Ron (1998), Titan: the Life of John D. Rockefeller, Sr, New York: Random House, ISBN 978-0-679-43808-3
- Edwards, Adolph (1907), The Roosevelt Panic of 1907 (PDF), Anitrock Pub. Co
- Fohlin, Caroline, and Zhikun Lu. "How Contagious Was the Panic of 1907? New Evidence from Trust Company Stocks." AEA Papers and Proceedings. Vol. 111. 2021. online
- Friedman, Milton; Jacobson Schwartz, Anna (1963), A Monetary History of the United States: 1867–1960, Princeton: Princeton University Press, ISBN 978-0-691-00354-2
- Gorton, Gary (2009), "Clearinghouses and the Origin of Central Banking in the United States", The Journal of Economic History, 45 (2): 277–283, doi:10.1017/S0022050700033957, S2CID 154291456
- Gorton, Gary; Huang, Lixin (2006), "Bank panics and the endogeneity of central banking" (PDF), Journal of Monetary Economics, 53 (7): 1613–1629, doi:10.1016/j.jmoneco.2005.05.015
- Herrick, Myron T. (1908), "The Panic of 1907 and Some of Its Lessons", Annals of the American Academy of Political and Social Science, 31 (2): 8–25, doi:10.1177/000271620803100203, JSTOR 1010701, S2CID 144195201
- Jaremski, Matthew, and David C. Wheelock. "Interbank Networks and the Interregional Transmission of Financial Crises: Evidence from the Panic of 1907." FRB St. Louis Working Paper 2022-20 (2022). online
- Johnson, Owen (1913), The Sixty-first Second (PDF), New York: Frederick A. Stokes Company, OCLC 3101622. Retrieved January 11, 2010.
- Kynaston, David (2017). Till Time's Last Sand: A History of the Bank of England, 1694–2013. New York: Bloomsbury. pp. 261–262. ISBN 978-1408868560.
- Leab, Daniel, ed. (2014). Encyclopedia of American Recessions and Depressions. ABC-CLIO 2 vol 919 pp. ISBN 9781598849462. pp 329–78
- Kindleberger, Charles P.; Aliber, Robert (2005), Manias, Panics, and Crashes: A History of Financial Crises (5th ed.), Hoboken: John Wiley & Sons, ISBN 978-0-471-46714-4
- McNelis, Sarah (1969), Copper King at War: The Biography of F. Augustus Heinze (2nd ed.), Missoula: University of Montana Press, OCLC 7369533
- Miron, Jeffrey A. (1986), "Financial Panics, the Seasonality of the Nominal Interest Rate, and the Founding of the Fed" (PDF), American Economic Review, 76 (1): 125–40
- Moen, Jon; Tallman, Ellis (1992), "The Bank Panic of 1907: The Role of the Trust Companies", The Journal of Economic History, 52 (3): 611–30, doi:10.1017/S0022050700011414, S2CID 154316738
- Noyes, Alexander Dana (1909), Forty Years of American Finance, G. P. Putnam's sons, ISBN 978-0-405-13672-6
- Odell, Kerry A.; Weidenmier, Marc D. (2004), "Real Shock, Monetary Aftershock: The 1906 San Francisco Earthquake and the Panic of 1907" (PDF), The Journal of Economic History, 64 (4): 1002–1027, doi:10.1017/S0022050704043062, hdl:10419/94590, S2CID 155027411
- Prins, Nomi (2014), All the Presidents' Bankers: The Hidden Alliances that Drive American Power, New York: Bold Type Books, ISBN 978-1-56858-491-1
- Smith, B. Mark (2004), A History of the Global Stock Market; From Ancient Rome to Silicon Valley, Chicago: University of Chicago Press, ISBN 978-0-226-76404-7
- Sprague, Oliver M.W. (1908), "The American Crisis of 1907", The Economic Journal, 18 (71): 353–372, doi:10.2307/2221551, JSTOR 2221551
- Tallman, Ellis W.; Moen, Jon (1990), "Lessons from the Panic of 1907" (PDF), Federal Reserve Bank of Atlanta Economic Review, 75: 2–13, archived from the original (PDF) on October 29, 2008. Retrieved on September 14, 2008.
