= Aircraft Board =

Erstwhile United States federal government organisation

The Aircraft Board was a United States federal government organization created from the Aircraft Production Board on October 1, 1917, by Act of Congress to provide statutory authority to the APB, which had been created by a resolution of the Council of National Defense on May 16, 1917. Chaired by Howard E. Coffin, the Aircraft Board was also removed from the control of the Council of National Defense and placed under the Secretaries of War and the Navy. The boards, ruled advisory in nature by the Judge Advocate General, gave their recommendations to the Aviation Section, U.S. Signal Corps regarding the development and procurement of aircraft during World War I.

The board consisted initially of Coffin, Brig. Gen. George O. Squier (Chief Signal Officer), Rear Adm. David W. Taylor (Chief of the Bureau of Construction of the Navy), S.D. Waldron, Edward A. Deeds, and Col. Robert L. Montgomery. On June 16, 1917, it added Col. Raynal C. Bolling, and on September 14, 1917, Col. Benjamin D. Foulois and Capt. N. E. Irwin, all of the Aviation Section.

After Howard Coffin had resigned under corruption allegations in March, President Wilson appointed John D. Ryan in April 1918 to replace Coffin as head of the board.
