= Howard E. Coffin =

American industrialist and automotive engineer

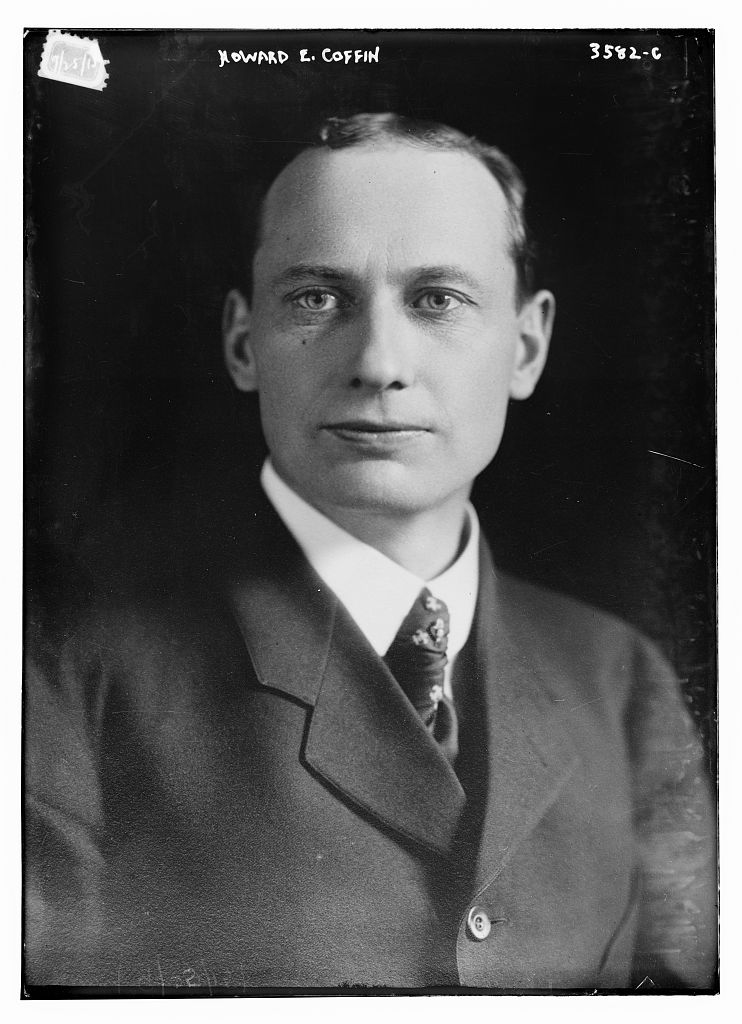
- Portrait of Howard E. Coffin in the 1900s
- Born: Howard Earle Coffin; September 6, 1873; West Milton, Ohio, U.S.
- Died: November 21, 1937 (aged 64); St. Simons Island, Georgia, U.S.
- Education: University of Michigan
- Occupations: American automotive engineer and industrialist
- Years active: 1895–1937, his death
- Spouse(s): Matilda V. Allen, 1907–1932, her death

Howard Earle Coffin (September 6, 1873 – November 21, 1937) was an American automobile engineer and industrialist. He was one of the founders of the Hudson Motor Car Company with Roy D. Chapin. He was a charter member of The Society of Automotive Engineers and president in 1910, and as one of the "dollar-a-year men" served as chairman of the Aircraft Board which organized aircraft production and industrial mobilization during World War I. He retired from the Hudson company in 1930 but acted as a consultant. He died accidentally in 1937.

== Biography ==
He was born on September 6, 1873, on a farm near West Milton, Ohio, and raised there and in Ann Arbor, Michigan, during his early years. He was the son of Julius Coffin and Sarah Jones Coffin, both an immigrant from England. He completed his preparatory education at a boarding school in Tennessee and the Ann Arbor High School. He studied mechanical engineering at the University of Michigan. It was there that he constructed his first automobile. It was steam-powered, and he used it to deliver the mail around town. He also made use of the university's engineering shop in 1898–99 to build his first internal combustion engine. This automobile is preserved in the Henry Ford Museum.

Coffin is known in automotive circles as the Father of Standardization, a result of his initiative in standardizing material and design specifications and in arranging for automobile manufacturers to share their patents. These accomplishments enabled the American automobile industry to grow quickly. Upon graduation in 1902, he started working for Oldsmobile as chief experimental engineer, and later as chief engineer. Roy Chapin and he compiled the first comprehensive instruction book for car owners.

He then worked for the E. R. Thomas–Detroit Motor Car Company. This development came after Coffin and Chapin failed to secure financial support in the Pacific coast to organize their venture. On the way back to Detroit, they met Edwin Thomas on the train. The pair was able to convince him to fund the Thomas-Detroit Company. By early May 1906, he was one of the five founders of what became Chalmers–Detroit Motor Company, as first vice-president. He served as vice president and chief engineer of Hudson Motor Car Company, designing many of their early models. With new financing thru one of the six principals, the respected department store merchant and bank officer, Joseph L. Hudson, provided much of the capitalization set at $100,000. The first Hudson, Model 20, was built on July 3, 1909.

A millionaire by age 30, Coffin purchased extensive real estate in Georgia such as Sapelo Island, and Sea Island, turning it into a resort. Coffin married Matilda V. Allen of Battle Creek, Michigan, in 1907.

When the United States were confronted with World War I, Coffin joined the Naval Construction Board and was also the chairman of the Committee on Industrial Preparedness in 1916, and in 1917 became chair of the Aircraft Production Board. After he had resigned under corruption allegations in March, President Wilson appointed John D. Ryan in April 1918 to replace Coffin as head of the board.

He inadvertently killed himself at Sea Island on November 21, 1937, the result of a gunshot wound from his favorite rifle. He and his wife are buried at Christ Church at St. Simons Island, Georgia.
