= F. Augustus Heinze =

American mining magnate (1869–1914)

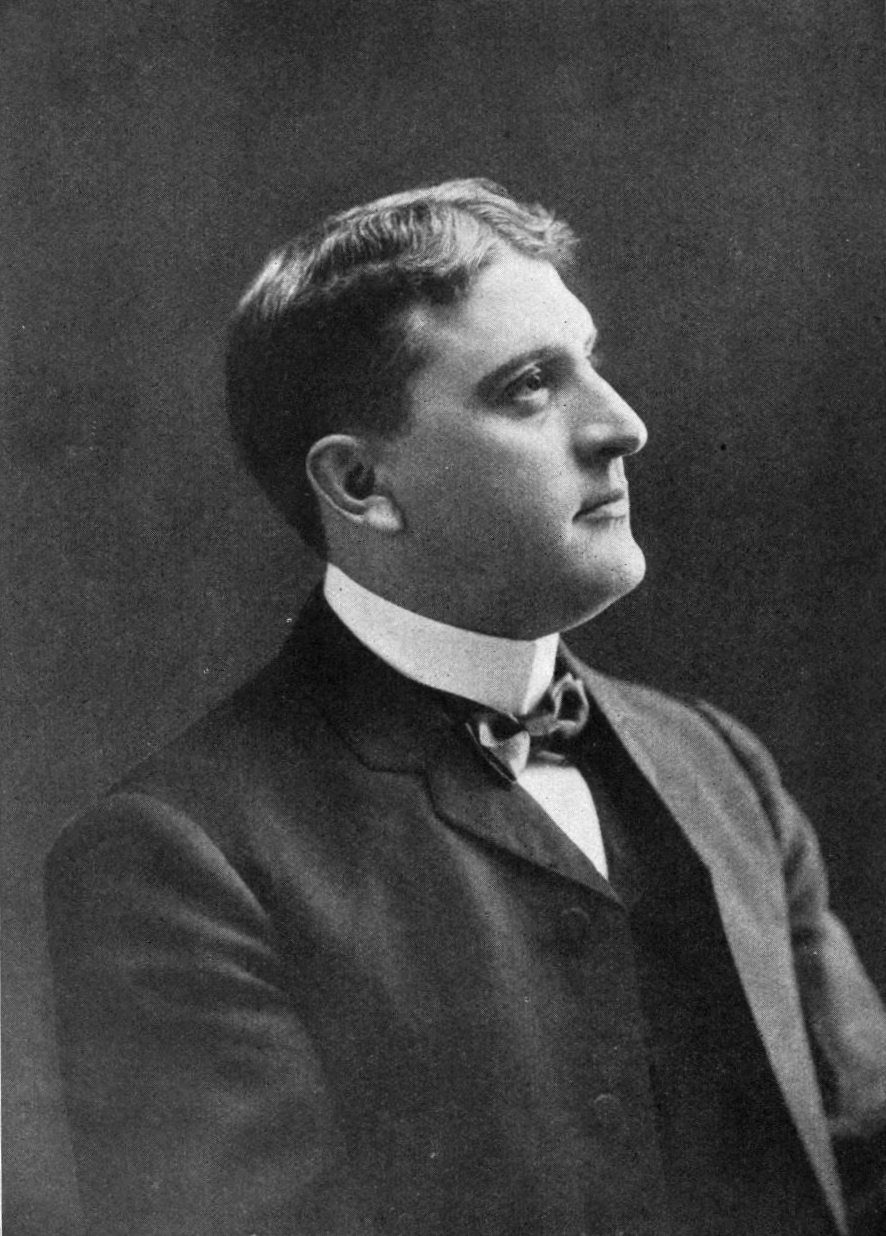
- Heinze c. 1904
- Born: Frederick Augustus Heinze; December 5, 1869; Brooklyn, New York, US
- Died: November 4, 1914 (aged 44); Saratoga, New York, US
- Education: Brooklyn Polytechnic Institute; Columbia School of Mines
- Occupation: Businessman
- Spouse: Bernice Golden
- Children: 1

Frederick "Fritz" Augustus Heinze (German pronunciation: [ˈhaɪntsə]) (December 5, 1869 – November 4, 1914) was an American businessman, known as one of the four Copper Kings of Butte, Montana, along with William Andrews Clark, and Marcus Daly. Contemporary assessments variously described him as an intelligent, charismatic but also devious character. To some people in Montana, he was seen as a hero for standing up to the Amalgamated Copper Company, but he also eventually sold his Butte interests to Amalgamated for a reported $12 million. Thereafter, he played a significant role in the Panic of 1907, for which he was indicted but eventually exonerated. Ultimately, Heinze's flamboyant, hard-drinking lifestyle resulted in a hemorrhage of the stomach thought to be caused by cirrhosis of the liver, and he died in November 1914, aged 44.

== Early life ==
Fritz Augustus Heinze was born in Brooklyn, New York, to wealthy immigrant parents, Otto Heinze, from Germany and Elizabeth "Lida" Lacey, from Ireland. He was named Fritz but generally went by F. Augustus, and later by the name Frederick. He was very bright and had a good education in Germany (from 9 to 15 years of age) and at Brooklyn Polytechnic Institute (now part of NYU) and was fluent in multiple languages. He then graduated from Columbia School of Mines, New York, in 1889. Instead of undertaking further studies in Germany, as his father wished, he headed west to Colorado and Salt Lake City to pursue his interest in mining.

== Mining interests in Montana ==
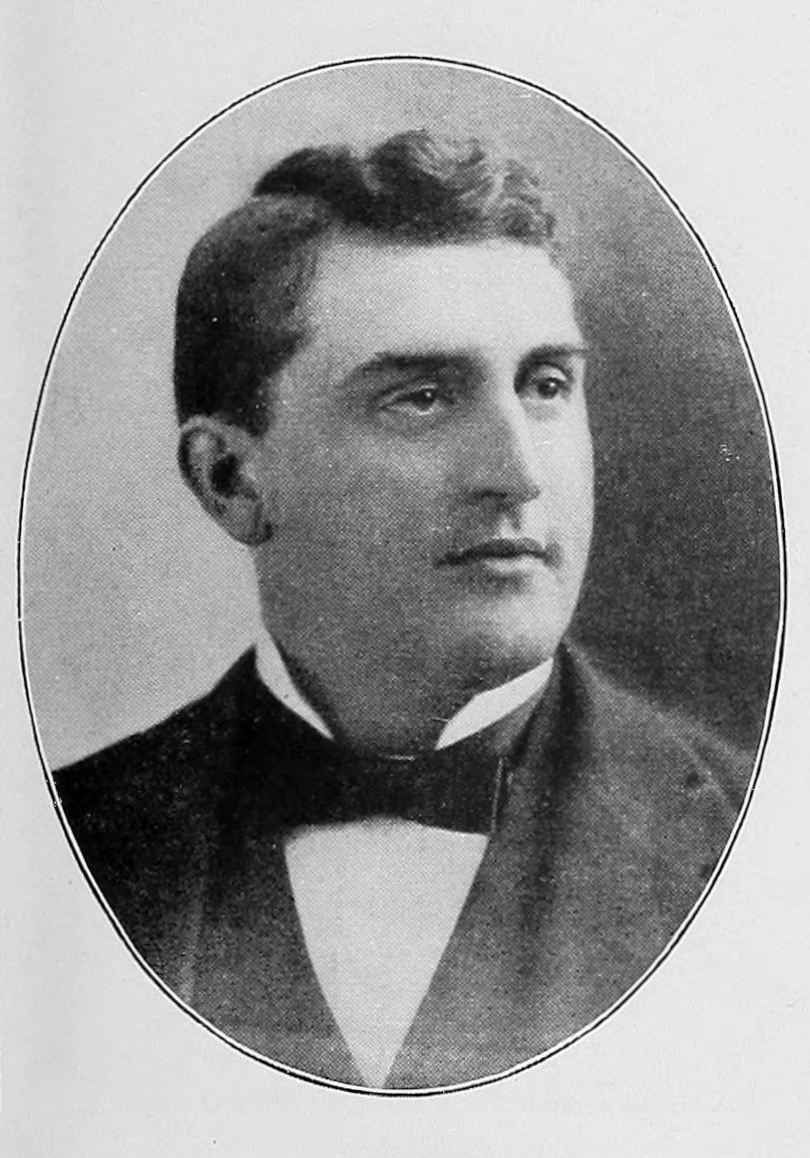
Heinze in the 1890s

Heinze arrived in Butte, Montana, in 1889 as a mining engineer for the Boston and Montana Company. He became known for his hard drinking and fun-loving antics in Butte's saloons and gambling dens, whilst donning society dress and having a shy demeanor and polished manners that impressed the ladies. Assisted by an inheritance of $50,000 from his recently deceased father, Heinze revelled in working hard to be a significant player. In 1894, Heinze's Montana Ore Purchasing Company opened a sophisticated new smelter, allowing Heinze to offer low-priced smelting to small mining companies. Originally, Heinze had to lease mines and secure ore from independent companies in order to keep operating. Heinze was able to locate rich ore bodies and the Rarus Mine, purchased in 1895, turned out to be one of Butte's premier mining properties.

When Heinze arrived in Butte, the first two "Copper Kings", William A. Clark and Marcus Daly, were well-established, (Daly's company was Anaconda Copper, after 1899 known as the Amalgamated Copper Mining Company, whose directors William Rockefeller and Henry H. Rogers also were major figures in Standard Oil). In order to build his own influence, Heinze's strategies included reducing the working day for his miners from ten to eight hours. For this, they considered him a hero. Heinze also built power by using a provision of the General Mining Act of 1872 which allowed a mine owner to excavate the veins that outcropped on his claim and follow them underground wherever they went, even if they went beneath claims owned by others. This was known as the law of the apex, and Heinze maintained that his miners had the right to follow veins and take out copper ore wherever it could be found. Using this law to his advantage, when his works encroached upon the mines of others, Heinze would employ up to 30 lawyers at a time and tie up his opponents in the legal system with case after case.

With skillful political maneuverings, Heinze also saw to it that individuals sympathetic to his legal position were appointed as judges in Butte. In one incident, a "pretty girl" was found to have offered a judge $100,000, and Heinze was implicated but never charged. Heinze was also a brilliant orator, and in speeches to the miners and public he would paint the Amalgamated Company as a ruthless and oppressive organization, and himself as the hero of the working class.

In 1902, Heinze combined his various mining interests into a company called United Copper Company, valued at $80 million with capacity to produce 40 million pounds of copper a year, compared to 143 million a year produced by Amalgamated.

In 1903, frustrated when the Rarus property was subject to a court order to cease mining, Heinze's miners continued anyway, breaking through from the Rarus into an adjoining Amalgamated property. Before being stopped, Heinze succeeded in taking out a hundred thousand tons of high grade copper ore. There was hand-to-hand combat with Amalgamated miners, opposition mine shafts were fouled through burning rubber and spreading caustic slaked lime, grenades were thrown, and high pressure hoses were fired. Dynamite was also set off, caving in the property and completely obliterating all the evidence. Heinze was charged with contempt of court yet he was fined only $20,000.

The actions of Heinze had severely hampered the giant Amalgamated Company. In 1906, after a decade of the mining war, John D Ryan negotiated with Heinze for Heinze to sell his Butte interests to Amalgamated for a reported $12 million. His mining days in Butte, Montana, had come to an end but Heinze had amassed a fortune.

== Heinze's role in the Panic of 1907 ==
In 1907, Heinze moved to New York to be a major player, this time in the financial arena. He based his company, United Copper, at 42 Broadway, just around the corner from Wall Street. Heinze entered the banking business, forming a close alliance with Charles W. Morse with whom he served on the boards of at least six national banks, ten state banks, five trust companies, and four insurance companies.

Across the corridor from Heinze were his brothers Otto and Arthur P. Heinze, who had a brokerage firm. It was Otto who formulated the ill-fated financial ploy in October 1907 that dramatically failed and was a major catalyst to a massive American financial collapse, called "The Panic of 1907". Otto's plan was to aggressively purchase the stock of United Copper so that the price would soar. Then, with prices high, and Otto controlling most of the stock, he would force the short-sellers to repay the borrowed stock. The short-sellers would have no option but to settle with Otto for high prices.

But Otto overestimated how much of the company the family controlled. When he forced the borrowers to buy back stock, they were able to get it from other sources. When the market realized his "corner" had failed, the stock price of United Copper collapsed. From there panic spread, as people pulled money out of banks associated with Heinze, and then from trust companies associated with those banks. Heinze had eventually supported his brother's ploy and due to his heavy involvement in the financial system suffered great financial and personal losses. He was barred from any further involvement in financial institutions.

The Panic of 1907 was one of the most significant financial crises in American history. There had been several contributing factors, such as the huge cost of the devastating 1906 San Francisco earthquake, but it was the actions of the Heinze brothers that had caused much of the panic. The 1907 crash eventually lead to the formation of the US Federal Reserve System in 1913.

=== Charges against Heinze ===
In 1908, Heinze was indicted for his role in the corner, and there were a string of court cases that lasted for years in the New York courts. However, a series of fortunate incidents in the courts led to his full exoneration.

When Heinze returned to Butte after his exoneration "His arrival was a monumental event. Reception committees met his train ... A lively band and an automobile procession of his followers paraded into town ... A large rope was attached to the wagon tongue so more men could assist in pulling their hero."

One of the more exciting stories is that of the missing financial records for United Copper. In June 1909, Heinze, his brother Arthur P. Heinze, and Carlos Warfield (President of the Ohio Copper Company) were indicted for spiriting away the books and correspondence of United Copper. Secret service men trailed the United Copper men with their luggage trunks full of company books. The trunks journeyed from New York to New Jersey and back. Then one of the men tried to take a trunk to Montreal, Quebec, Canada, but the railway baggage man would not accept the 378-pound trunk. The trunks were eventually found in a basement on West Fifty-Fifth Street in New York. Two further trunks were missing but Heinze promised a judge that he would find them.

After the hiding of the books, the directors of the United Copper Company rebelled against Heinze, but on the day before he was to be removed, he replaced the board of directors, preempting his removal.

Heinze was also charged with assaulting a cab driver in New York, but the judge dismissed the case, agreeing with Heinze that the cab driver had charged too high a fee. Part of Heinze's defense was that just because the cab driver was smaller than him, that did not mean that he may not have a good punch and Heinze felt he had to punch him first.

== Mining interests in Utah ==
Just prior to the tumultuous events of 1907, Heinze's interests had turned to the mines of Bingham Canyon, southwest of Salt Lake City, Utah. Heinze purchased a controlling interest in the Bingham Consolidated Mining and Smelting Company and the Ohio Copper Company. Unfortunately while Heinze fought his many charges in the courts, the operations struggled for funding and Heinze's involvement in Utah eventually proved to be more as an impediment than as a savior.

The mining operation and mills of all the companies at Bingham were located in the narrow Bingham Canyon, including Ohio's small 150 ton/day Winnamuck mill. The story went that the canyon was so narrow that for a dog to wag his tail in the canyon the dog had to wag it up and down, not side to side.

=== Mascotte tunnel ===
Due to the location of the underground mines, the Ohio Copper Company sought to have an advantage over its opponents by transporting the ore from the mines to a mill (with planned capacity of 3000 ton/day) which they would build at the township of Lark, outside the canyon. The transporting of the ore could only be done by way of a tunnel. Expansion of the existing Dalton & Lark tunnel started in 1907. The three-mile long tunnel was called the Mascotte Tunnel after an early director of the Dalton & Lark company.

The Mascotte tunnel was owned by Bingham Consolidated, a company that was heading towards bankruptcy. Heinze was never one to miss an opportunity and Bingham Consolidated (with Heinze as a major stockholder) sold the tunnel (still unfinished) to the Bingham Central Railway Company (a company owned wholly by Heinze) for $150,000. With this transaction, Heinze had gained sole ownership of the only route that would one day link the Ohio Copper Company's mines and its mill.

When the tunnel was completed in March 1909, the General Manager, Colin McIntosh, said: "It was one of the most difficult pieces of surveying in the state and the men who did it without being an inch out of the way, cannot be given too much praise." Heinze visited Salt Lake City for the first time since 1906 to inspect the facilities. He was greeted with much joy by the miners, many of whom had worked for Heinze in Montana. The location of the Mascotte Tunnel exit is at (40°31'37" N, 112°05'52" W).

In 1909, there was considerable angst among shareholders of Heinze's control of the Ohio Copper Company through the company's only lifeline, the Mascotte tunnel. An unnamed director said in an interview that "Should Mr. Heinze at any time deny it use of the Mascotte tunnel, it would be left without access to its own mill except by devious and expensive methods. ... it is the consensus of opinion that he is slightly too cagey to permit pass the opportunity to insure himself a commanding position over Ohio Copper ...".

John D Ryan (who had negotiated the deal with Heinze in Montana) and Thomas F Cole from Amalgamated Copper offered to purchase the Ohio Copper Company from Heinze. However, they made the offer on the proviso that the Mascotte tunnel was part of the deal. Heinze refused.

In December 1910 there was growing concern about the running of the Ohio Copper Company. Large shareholders were reportedly dissatisfied with the Heinze management and felt the company's earnings were not sufficient to satisfy creditors, who were asking for settlement of their claims. The Bingham Central Railway Company was charging the Ohio Copper Company 15 cents for each ton of ore transported through the Mascotte tunnel earning Heinze around $200–300 per day.

=== Heinze's departure ===
The Steven's Copper Handbook, 1911, said of Heinze:

The United Copper company is operated as a blind pool by F Augustus Heinze, who has shown himself utterly rapacious, unscrupulous and conscienceless in his mining and financial operations. About one-third of the common stock is held in Holland, and the unfortunate Dutch investors were endeavoring June, 1911, to obtain some explicit information regarding the company's affairs ... the United Copper Company can be considered only as an exceptionally daring piece of stock jobbery.

In February 1913 the United Copper Company was placed into receivership so its assets (including Ohio Copper) could be unwound. In mid 1914, at an acrimonious shareholders meeting, control of the Ohio Copper Company passed from Heinze to William O Allison, president of the company. Payments due had not been met and Heinze claimed that his ongoing legal costs were the reason.

Following Heinze's departure, the Bingham Central Railway Company (Mascotte tunnel) was rolled into the new Ohio Copper Company and the combined company was named the Ohio Copper Mining Company of Utah, which operated until 1951. The properties of Ohio Copper are now part of the massive Bingham Canyon Mine.

== Family and death ==
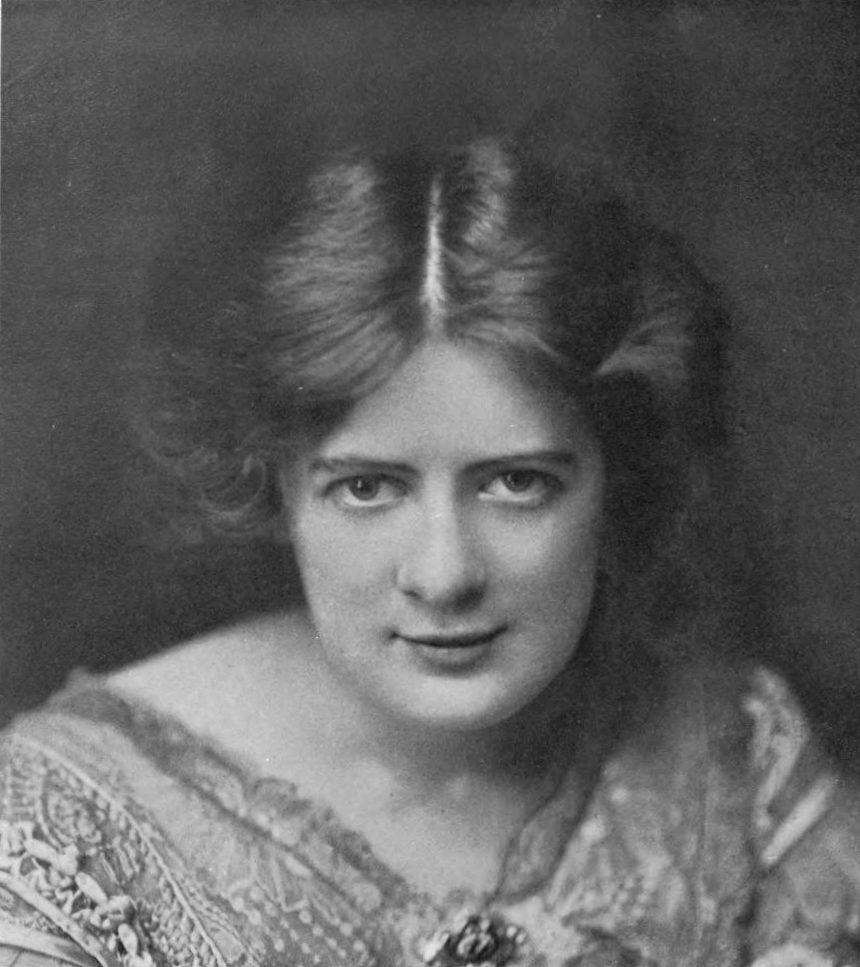
Heinze married actress Bernice Golden Henderson in 1910

On August 31, 1910, Heinze was married to the actress Bernice Golden Henderson. Their son, F. Augustus Heinze Jr., was born December 6, 1911. They divorced in 1912, but were reconciled at Bernice's death bed in 1913.

In November 1914, Heinze suffered a hemorrhage of the stomach caused by cirrhosis of the liver, and died at 44 years of age. Heinze did not leave a will. His estate was battled over by two women who both claimed to be legally married to him, but it was left to his two-year-old son Fritz Augustus Jr. who was adopted by Heinze's sister, Lida Fleitmann Bloodgood.

The Philadelphia Inquirer wrote: "Heinze's fight may have been worthwhile. He may have accomplished substantive good for Montana, but his early death in comparative poverty illustrates how devious are the ways of the speculator and how dangerous is the game." Some of the residents of Butte, Montana, thought about building a statue in his honour but it never happened.
