= United Copper =

20th-century mining company

- Type: Public (trade on the curb)
- Industry: Copper mining
- Founded: 1902; 124 years ago
- Defunct: 1913; 113 years ago
- Fate: Placed in receivership
- Headquarters: Incorporated in New Jersey
- Key people: F. Augustus Heinze

The United Copper Company was a short-lived United States copper mining business in the early 20th century that played a pivotal role in the Panic of 1907.

== Incorporation ==
United Copper was incorporated in 1902 by F. Augustus Heinze, a copper magnate who had tussled for years with Amalgamated Copper for lucrative copper mines in Butte, Montana. The firm was incorporated in New Jersey with an authorized capital of US$80,000,000. United Copper combined Heinze's interests in The Montana Ore Purchasing Company, The Nipper Consolidated Copper Company, The Minnie Healy Mining Company, The Corra Rock-Island Mining Company, and The Belmont Mining Company.

Upon consolidation, United Copper was capable of producing about 42 million pounds (19 thousand metric tons) of copper a year, as compared to 143 million pounds (65 thousand metric tons) per year for Amalgamated Copper.

United Copper was literally traded "on the curb" outside the New York Stock Exchange (NYSE). "On the curb" trading was later formalized as the American Stock Exchange (AMEX).

== Attempt to corner the market in United Copper stock ==
In 1907, after its legal battles with Amalgamated had finally been settled, United Copper again found itself the center of a scandal: in October, F. Augustus Heinze's brother, Otto Heinze, devised a scheme to corner the market in United Copper stock. The Heinzes owned a large share of the company and Otto believed that many of these shares had been loaned out to investors hoping to short sell the stock.

Short sellers borrow, or make arrangements to borrow, the stock of a company, which they then sell at current prices. If prices later drop, they repurchase shares of the company, now at a cheaper price, to replace the borrowed stock. The difference is the profit of the short seller. Heinze's plan was to move aggressively to purchase the stock of United Copper. The price would soar high. Then, with prices high, and Heinze controlling most of the stock, he would force the short-sellers to repay the borrowed stock, a move called a "short squeeze." The short-sellers would have no option but to settle with Heinze for high prices.

But Otto Heinze overestimated how much of the company the family controlled. When he forced the borrowers to buy back stock, they were able to get it from other sources. When the market realized his corner had failed, the stock price of United Copper collapsed. So shocking was the collapse, that depositors rushed to pull the money out of the banks of F. Augustus Heinze. From there, panic spread, as people pulled money out of banks associated with Heinze, and then from trust companies associated with those banks (see Panic of 1907).

== Decline and placement into receivership ==
In 1908, F. Augustus Heinze was indicted for his role in the corner. The share price of United Copper, meanwhile, never recovered. In 1913 the company was placed into receivership, so its assets could be unwound.
