= Community Bookstore =

Community Bookstore is the name of two bookstores in Brooklyn, New York, both initially owned and operated by husband and wife John Scioli and Susan Scioli.

- Community Bookstore in Cobble Hill (formerly of Brooklyn Heights)
- Community Bookstore in Park Slope
