= Albertine Books =

Bookstore in New York

Coordinates: 40.7767°N 73.9637°W

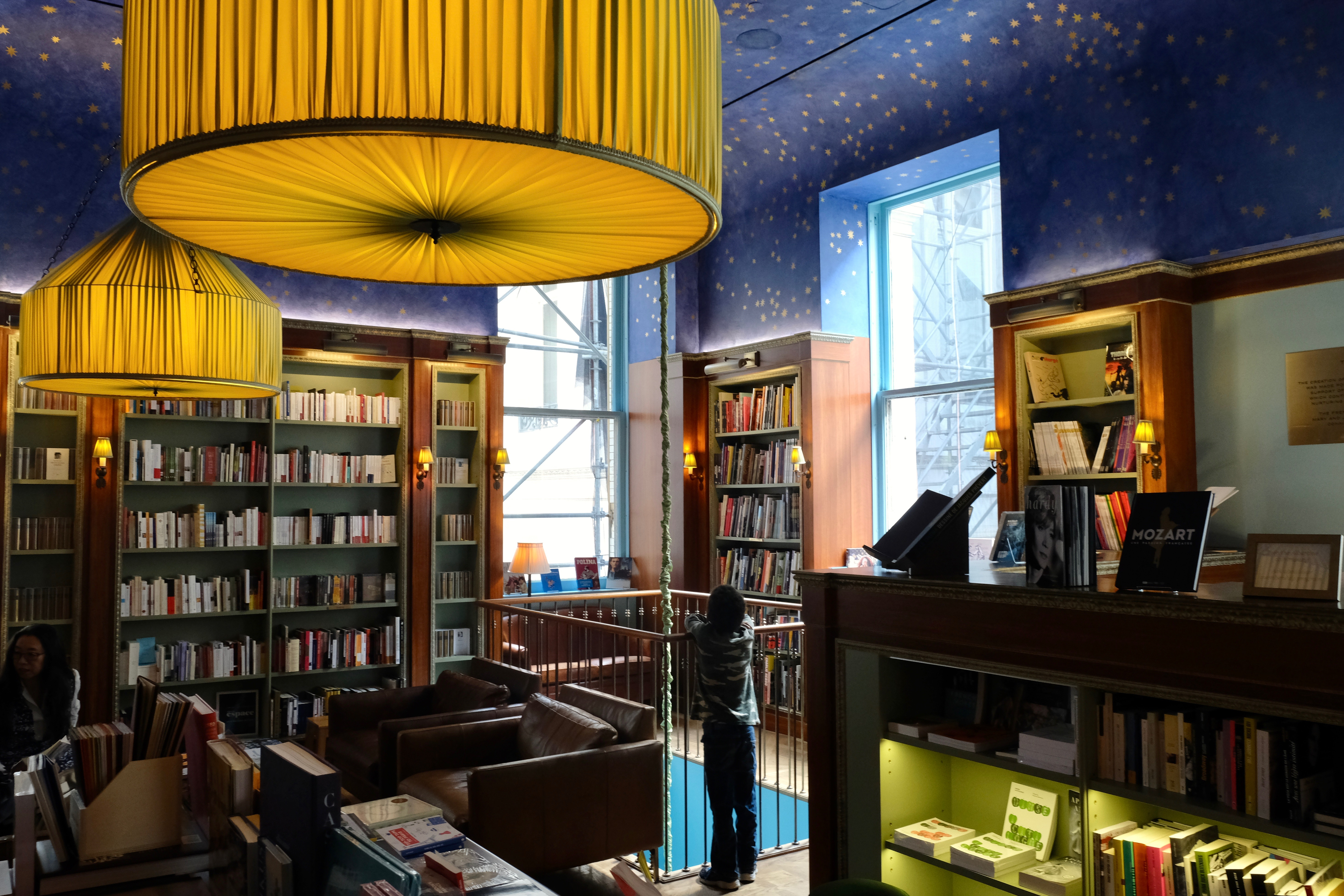
- Industry: Bookstore
- Website: albertine.com

Albertine Books is a bookstore in Manhattan, New York. Opened in 2014, it offers the largest collection in the United States of French-language books and translations from French into English. It is located in the Payne Whitney House at 972 Fifth Avenue, between 78th and 79th Streets.

In addition to its bookstore and reading room, Albertine Books hosts frequent public events and organizes French Book Corners in a network of independent bookstores throughout the United States.

== Payne Whitney House ==
Albertine Books is in the landmark Payne Whitney House that now also houses the Cultural Services of the Embassy of France, Washington, D.C. The high Italian Renaissance building was designed by Stanford White. The French government purchased the building in 1952, at the initiative of structural anthropologist Claude Lévi-Strauss.

== History ==
The bookstore and reading room of Albertine Books were opened to the public in September 2014, with over 14,000 titles from 30 French-speaking countries. Albertine Books was conceived by Antonin Baudry, former French Cultural Counsellor, as a hub for Franco-American intellectual exchange and was named after Marcel Proust's character.

The bookstore’s interior was designed by French designer Jacques Garcia, known for his work on the Chateau du Champ de Bataille in Normandy, France and The NoMad Hotel in New York City. “This is not intended as a retail place. It’s more like a grand private library, with nothing that you wouldn’t want to have at home,” said Baudry.

The visual identity of Albertine was conceived and designed by Pentagram and its partner, Abbott Miller, and "invokes the connection between books, knowledge, and Enlightenment, with references to Parisian Art Deco."

It is now New York’s only French bookshop and reading room, following the closing in 2009 of the Librairie de France, which had been a New York institution at Rockefeller Center for over 70 years.

== Activities ==
In addition to its bookstore and reading room, Albertine Book manages a busy schedule of cultural events. Its annual Night of Philosophy gathers dozens of philosophers and other intellectuals for 20-minute presentations that run all night long.

To promote French literature throughout the United States, Albertine Books has started a French Corner program with a network of other bookstores in the US that receive curated selections of French and Francophone titles. Participating bookstores include Brookline Booksmith (Boston), Community Bookstore (Brooklyn, New York), The Book Cellar (Chicago), Seminary Co-op (Chicago), Alliance Française (Los Angeles), Book Soup (Los Angeles), Alliance Française (Minneapolis), Green Apple Books on the Park (San Francisco), Elliott Bay Book Company (Seattle, WA), and Politics and Prose (Washington DC).

In 2018, Albertine Books launched the Albertine Prize, to recognize American readers’ favorite French-language fiction that has been translated into English.
