= Scioli =

Scioli (pronounced [ˈʃɔːli]) is an Italian surname. Notable people with the surname include:

- Brad Scioli (born 1976), American football player
- Daniel Scioli (born 1957), Argentine politician, sportsman and businessman
- John Scioli, founder and former owner of Community Bookstore in Brooklyn, New York
- Tom Scioli (born c. 1977), American comic book artist and writer
