= Kathleen Weil-Garris Brandt =

American art historian (born 1934)

- Born: Kathleen Weil-Garris; April 7, 1934 (age 92); Châtellerault, Nouvelle-Aquitaine, France or Surrey, United Kingdom
- Occupation: Art historian
- Awards: Guggenheim Fellowship (1975)

Academic background
- Education: Vassar College; Radcliffe College; Harvard University
- Thesis: The Santa Casa di Loreto: Problems in Italian Sixteenth-Century Sculpture (1965)

Academic work
- Discipline: Art history
- Sub-discipline: Renaissance art
- Institutions: New York University

Kathleen Weil-Garris Brandt (née Weil-Garris, formerly Posner; born April 7, 1934) is an American art historian. She served as a professor at New York University for decades, and has authored several books on Renaissance art. She was the 1997–1998 Slade Professor of Fine Art at the University of Oxford, as well as a 1975 Guggenheim Fellow.

== Biography ==
Weil-Garris was born on April 7, 1934, in Europe, (Note: Sources differ as to whether she was born in the French commune of Châtellerault or the English county of Surrey.) and raised in the United States. She was the daughter of Charlotte Garris and aviation engineer Kurt H. Weil, both German.

Weil-Garris obtained an AB at Vassar College in 1956, and after spending a year studying at the University of Bonn (1956–1957), obtained an MA from Radcliffe College in 1958 and a PhD from Harvard University in 1965. Her doctoral dissertation was titled The Santa Casa di Loreto: Problems in Italian Sixteenth-Century Sculpture. While at Vassar, she lived with Ayla Karacabey. She taught "The Age of Michelangelo", a 1965 Sunrise Semester course.

In 1963, Weil-Garris joined the New York University Department of Fine Art. Originally starting as adjunct assistant professor of fine arts, she was promoted to assistant professor in 1965, associate professor in 1967, and full professor in 1973, remaining as such for more than two decades. She was part of the College Art Association of America board of directors from 1973 to 1974. She was a 1985 Center for Advanced Study in the Visual Arts Visiting Senior Fellow. She was the 1997–1998 Slade Professor of Fine Art at the University of Oxford.

Weil-Garris was author of the books Leonardo and Central Italian Art, 1515–1550 (1974) and The Renaissance from Brunelleschi to Michelangelo: The Representation of Architecture (1993). In 1975, she was awarded a Guggenheim Fellowship "for a study of Baccio Bandinelli and the art of his time", and she was a 1976 Resident of the American Academy in Rome. She and James S. Ackerman produced a film titled Looking for Renaissance Rome (1976). She was the editor-in-chief for The Art Bulletin from 1977 to 1981. By 1990, the Vatican City later hired her as a Renaissance art consultant. She co-edited an exhibition catalogue for the 1999–2000 exhibition La giovinezza di Michelangelo.

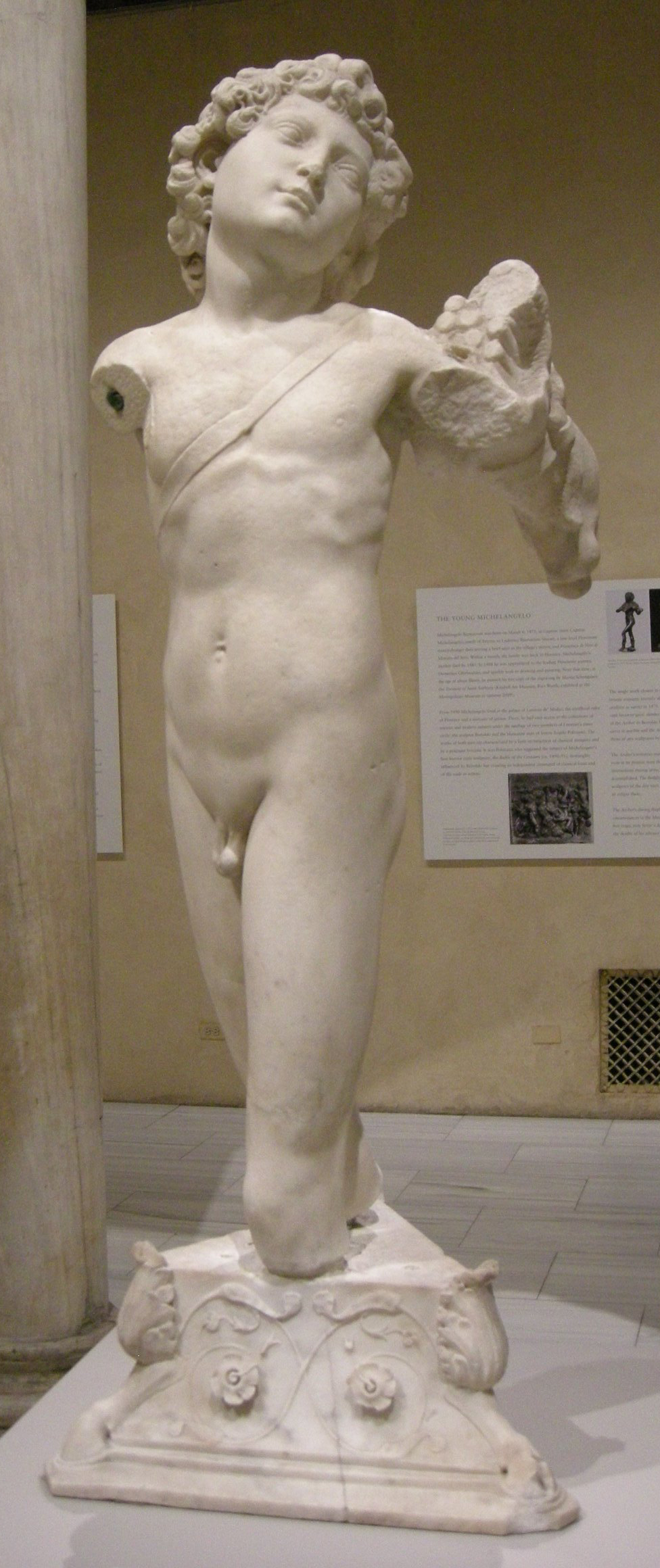
The Young Archer attributed by Weil-Garris to Michelangelo

In October 1995, while visiting the Payne Whitney House for a French art exhibition, Weil-Garris attributed a small marble statue there to Michelangelo. John Russell of The New York Times once said that this would be "Manhattan's only sculpture by Michelangelo", and Carey Lovelace of Newsday remarked that it would be "the only Michelangelo statue in the Western Hemisphere". This identification has been the subject of controversy, with art historians Leo Steinberg and James Beck expressing doubts over the attribution.

Weil-Garris was married to art historian Donald Posner – whom she met during her time at Harvard – from 1962 until their divorce. She then married physicist Werner Brandt in 1983; they remained married until his death that same year.

== Works ==
- Leonardo and Central Italian Art, 1515–1550 (1974)
- (with John F. D'Amico) The Renaissance Cardinal's Ideal Palace: A Chapter from Cortesi's De Cardinalatu (1980)
- The Renaissance from Brunelleschi to Michelangelo: The Representation of Architecture (1993)

== Notes ==
Academic offices
Preceded by David Bomford	Slade Professor of Fine Art, University of Oxford; 1997–1998	Succeeded by Joseph Connors
