= Payne Whitney House =

Building in Manhattan, New York

- The house as seen in 2026

General information
- Architectural style: High Italian Renaissance
- Location: 972 Fifth Avenue, Manhattan, New York, US
- Coordinates: 40°46′35.5″N 73°57′49″W
- Construction started: 1902
- Completed: 1909
- Client: William Payne Whitney
- Owner: Government of France

Technical details
- Floor count: 5 (plus 2 basements)

Design and construction
- Architect: Stanford White of McKim, Mead & White

New York City Landmark
- Designated: September 15, 1970
- Reference no.: 0737

The Payne Whitney House is a historic building at 972 Fifth Avenue, south of 79th Street, on the Upper East Side of Manhattan in New York City. It was designed in the High Italian Renaissance style by architect Stanford White of the firm McKim, Mead & White. Completed in 1909 as a private residence for businessman William Payne Whitney and his family, the building has housed the Cultural Services of the French Embassy in the United States since 1952.

The house has a five-story-tall gray-granite facade that is curved slightly outward. Each story is horizontally separated by an entablature. The interiors of the Payne Whitney mansion were designed in 16th- and 17th-century Renaissance styles. The first floor includes a rotunda that was decorated with an artwork attributed to Michelangelo, as well as the Venetian Room, a reception room that William Payne Whitney's wife Helen Hay Whitney particularly valued. Since 2014, the second and third stories have housed a French-language bookstore, Albertine Books.

The Whitney house was commissioned in 1902 by William's uncle Colonel Oliver Hazard Payne as a wedding gift. Construction took so long that, in the meantime, the couple's two children John (Jock) and Joan were born and Stanford White was killed. After the house's completion, William and Helen lived there until their respective deaths in 1927 and 1944. Jock Whitney sold the house in 1948 to a developer who converted it into apartments. The French government bought the building four years later. The New York City Landmarks Preservation Commission designated 972 Fifth Avenue as an official landmark in 1970. Various renovations have been conducted at the house over the years, including in the 1990s and 2010s.

== Site ==
The Payne Whitney House is at 972 Fifth Avenue on the Upper East Side of Manhattan in New York City. It is on the east side of Fifth Avenue, directly across from Central Park, midblock between 78th and 79th Street. The land lot covers 4,500 square feet (420 m^{2}) with a frontage of 45 feet (14 m) on Fifth Avenue and a depth of 100 feet (30 m). Nearby sites include the Harry F. Sinclair House to the north, the Stuyvesant Fish House to the east, and the James B. Duke House and 960 Fifth Avenue to the south. There is a yard on the south side of the house, separating it from the James B. Duke House. The Payne Whitney House was also built with a rear entrance on 79th Street, measuring 15 feet (4.6 m) wide.

The city block between Fifth Avenue, Madison Avenue, and 78th and 79th Streets was part of the Lenox family farm until 1877, when Marcellus Hartley bought the block for $420,000. The railroad magnate Henry H. Cook acquired the site for $500,000 in 1880. and owned it for the remainder of the 19th century. Cook built a house on the southwest corner of the block in 1883. Cook intended the block to house first-class residences, not high-rises, and only sold lots for the construction of private dwellings. By the early 1910s, the value of the land had increased to $6 million. Through the early 2000s, the block of Fifth Avenue remained largely intact, compared to other parts of Fifth Avenue's "Millionaire's Row".

== Architecture ==
The Payne Whitney House was designed in the high Italian Renaissance style by Stanford White of McKim, Mead & White. It was commissioned by Colonel Oliver Hazard Payne for his nephew William Payne Whitney and William's bride Helen Hay Whitney. The house was developed concurrently with the neighboring Henry Cook House at 973 Fifth Avenue; the two houses were among the last residences White designed before his death in 1906. According to Henry Hope Reed Jr., the inspiration for the Payne Whitney House's design is unclear, though the Pesaro Palace in Venice may have been one inspiration.

=== Facade ===
The Payne Whitney House's five-story facade is made of granite from Bethel, Vermont. The facade is curved slightly outward toward Fifth Avenue. It is designed to appear continuous with the facade of 973 Fifth Avenue directly to the north, which Stanford White also designed. The facade is divided horizontally into three sections: the base, the middle stories, and the attic. Each story is separated by an entablature. The facade details were evocative of those of the Joseph Pulitzer House on 73rd Street and, by extension, those of Palazzo Pesaro, Venice.

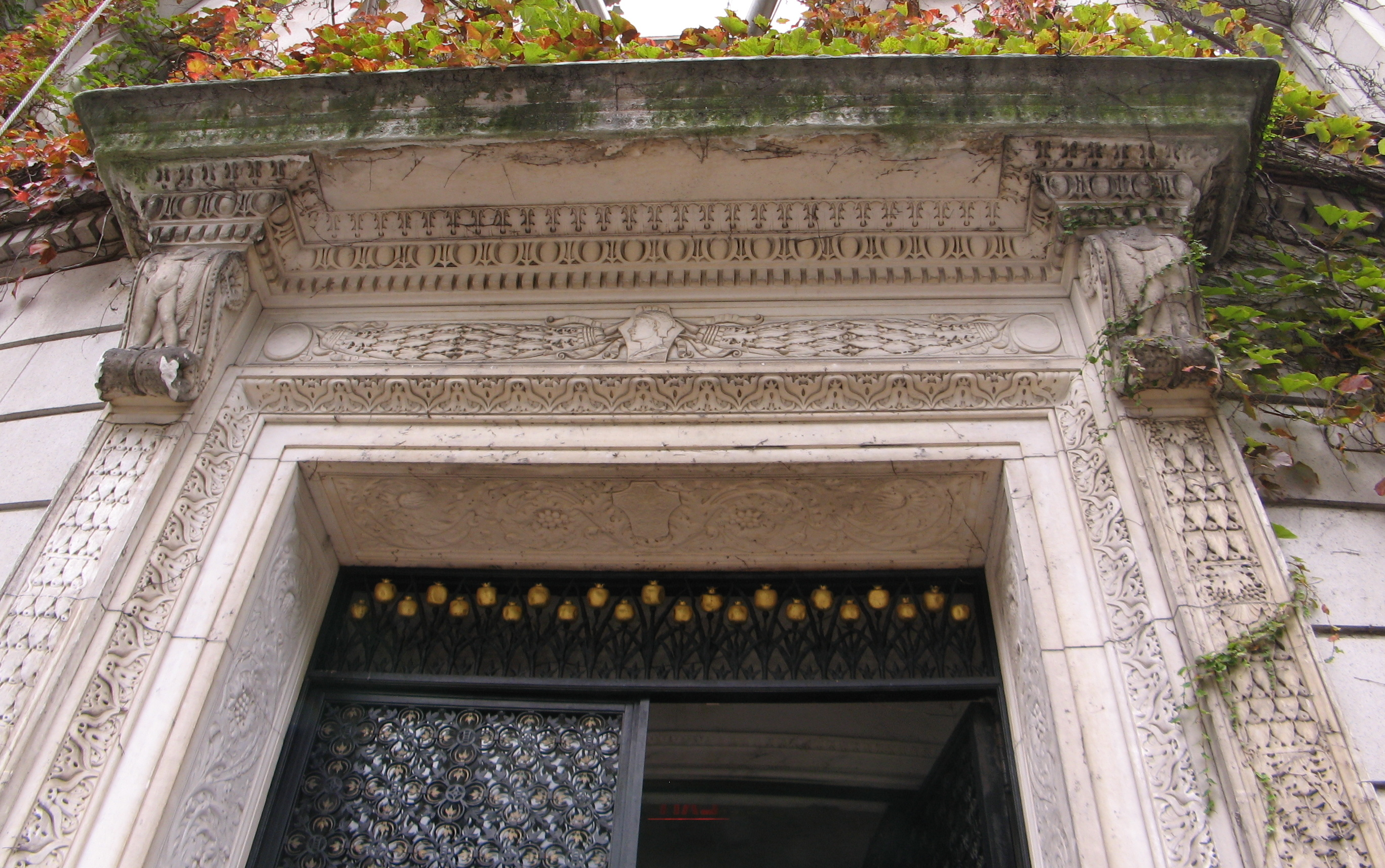
Detail of doorway

The ground floor contains blocks of rusticated stone, with a large marble entryway at the center flanked by a window on either side. The central entrance has a set of double doors with decorated grilles. Flanking the doorway are molded floral designs, as well as vertical pilasters with lions' heads at their bases and acanthus-and-maple-leaf panels above. Adolph Alexander Weinman designed these panels. There is a frieze directly above the doors, containing carvings of a wreath and medallions; directly above the frieze are egg-and-dart, dentilled, and acanthus leaf-and-dart moldings. The frieze is topped by a projecting cornice supported by carved console brackets on each end. Above the ground-floor windows on either side of the doorway, the joints of the rusticated facade are angled inward, creating voussoirs. Above the center of each window is a paneled keystone. The ground floor is topped by dentils and a band course with wave motifs.

The second floor contains round-arched windows flanked by paired Ionic pilasters. The spandrels at the arches' top corners contain carvings of cherubs, while the windows themselves are topped by bracketed keystones. The entablature above the windows consists of a frieze, dentils, and a cornice. The third-floor windows are square-headed and are flanked by paired Corinthian pilasters; each window has carved lions' heads and swags above it. The entablature above the third story also has dentils and a cornice. The fourth story has square-headed windows and paired composite pilasters, as well as low relief marble panels above each window, which depict classical scenes. A smaller entablature runs above the fourth story. The fifth floor has square-headed windows between pairs of carved vertical panels. Above each panel are ornamented brackets with foliate details. The tile roof is slightly pitched and is carried by a cornice made of stone.

There is a secondary facade facing south toward the James B. Duke House. The rusticated first story and the entablatures wrap around from the Fifth Avenue facade, but the window designs are simpler than on Fifth Avenue. The center of the southern facade has a slightly projecting pavilion. The rest of the south facade is flat. Adjacent to the south facade is the Florence Gould Garden. The side garden had been designed simultaneously with the rest of the house.

=== Interior ===
The house was built with masonry load-bearing walls and a steel superstructure. The house had 40 rooms in addition to two elevators, a basement, and a sub-basement. The building also contained 11 bathrooms, some of which had marble baths. The interiors of the mansion were designed in 16th- and 17th-century styles. The French firm of Allard et Fils imported the furnishings in the house. John La Farge designed four stained-glass windows themed to the seasons, while muralist James Wall Finn painted the decorations in entrance rotunda. The interior has been used as a setting for films such as Gone with the Wind (1939) and Rebecca (1940). It is still used as a filming location; for instance, the house has appeared in episodes of the TV shows Law & Order and The Blacklist.

==== First floor ====
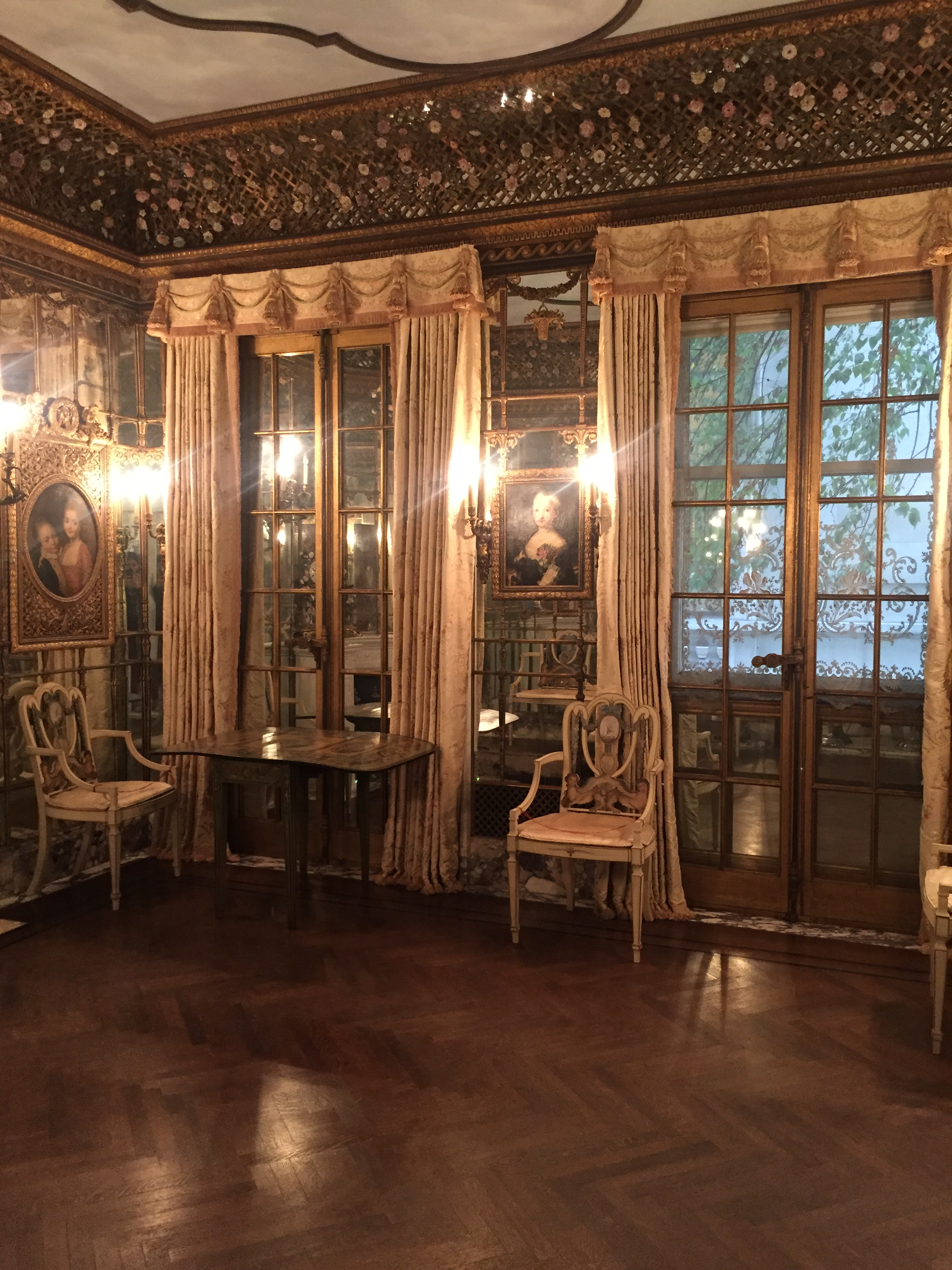
Room in the French Embassy Cultural Center

Just inside the entrance is a rotunda. Measuring 32.25 by 35 feet (9.83 by 10.67 m), it can fit 75 people. The rotunda's design resembles that of a peristyle and was inspired by the Villa Giulia's portico. The floors of the rotunda are clad in marble and are arranged in a grid with molded copper borders. Originally, the skins of various animals were used as floor coverings for the rotunda. Sixteen marble columns surround the rotunda and are arranged in pairs. The ceiling contains a motif of green leaves and yellow-tinted trellises; it is inlaid by eight medallions of playing children. These were painted by James Wall Finn. A white marble staircase leads to the second floor; it was originally decorated with a bronze railing, a wall frieze, and a carved-wood ceiling.

The center of the rotunda has a replica of Young Archer (c. 1490), a marble statue attributed to Michelangelo. After the sculpture had failed to sell at a 1902 auction in London, White had purchased the sculpture and installed it on a 3-foot-tall (0.91 m) pedestal at the Payne Whitney mansion. It went relatively unnoticed until 1990, when graduate student James Draper speculated that the work was by Bertoldo di Giovanni, a mentor of Michelangelo's. In 1996, Kathleen Weil-Garris Brandt, a longtime art historian for the New York University Institute of Fine Arts in the neighboring James B. Duke House, identified the sculpture as a genuine Michelangelo work after attending one of the French Cultural Service's exhibitions. In 2009, the statue was placed on loan several blocks north at the Metropolitan Museum of Art.

The Venetian Room, measuring 14 feet 10 inches (4.52 m) square, is just east of the rotunda, on the south wall of the house. It is accessed by wrought-iron doors from the rotunda. Serving as a reception room for the Whitney family, the Venetian Room was used to receive guests before they proceeded upstairs. The room's furnishings include painted furniture and a French-style clock. The walls contain mirrored panels framed by gold leaf. In place of a cornice, the coved ceiling was originally decorated with a latticework pattern containing plants and enameled flowers. Other decorations include high Renaissance doorways and mantels, as well as a candelabra in the Bavarian rococo style. As of 2021, the public has limited access to the room. North of the Venetian Room is a corridor leading from the rotunda to restrooms and private offices.

==== Other stories ====
The staircase from the first-floor rotunda leads directly to the main reception room on the second floor, which is used as a reception area for events. The main reception room measures 24 by 26 feet (7.3 by 7.9 m) and can fit 75 people. Architecture magazine described the second-floor reception room as having "some excellent antique columns, a staircase with beautifully designed bronze rail, and a truly wonderful frieze and carved wood ceiling". The room also contains decorations such as gilded doors with mirrors. Immediately in front of it is another reception room facing Fifth Avenue, which measures 30 by 34 feet (9.1 by 10.4 m) and can fit 75 people.

When built, the house had other decorated rooms scattered throughout the interior. One of these was a salon with velvet hangings and pictures on the walls. The dining room had a coffered ceiling and hanging lamps above a tapestry. The breakfast room was decorated with a bright color scheme and also had a mantel and paneling in the Louis XVI style. Payne Whitney's private library had brocade walls, a carved-wood ceiling, and a Baroque-style doorway, as well as upholstered tacks on the walls. Helen Hay had a studio with a segmentally-arched ceiling, sparsely-decorated walls, and ornate furniture. One of John La Farge's four stained-glass windows, entitled Autumn, is on a staircase landing between the second and third floors.

On the second and third floors are the Albertine Books bookstore and reading room, designed by French designer Jacques Garcia. Albertine Books is considered part of the French consulate, so sales of books in the store follow French law. The reading room and bookstore are on separate levels, connected by their own staircase. The second-story section of the bookstore is within the Whitney family's former private library. Its ceiling has a mural depicting constellations, with a blue background and decorative gold details that converge at the center. The mural was inspired by one in Germany's Villa Stuck. The Albertine space also has custom furniture and carved busts of French and French-American historical figures.

== History ==
William Payne Whitney and Helen Hay married in February 1902. The groom was the son of William Collins Whitney and Flora Payne, of the prominent Whitney family. The bride's father was John Milton Hay, who was the United States Secretary of State at the time. Media at the time reported that William's uncle, Oliver Payne, would erect a mansion for the newlyweds as a wedding gift.

=== Construction ===
In March 1902, Oliver Payne paid Henry H. Cook $525,000 for a lot measuring 70 by 100 feet (21 by 30 m) on the east side of Fifth Avenue between 78th and 79th Streets. The purchase included a 15-by-102-foot (4.6 by 31.1 m) parcel that led to 79th Street, creating an L-shaped assemblage. As a condition of the sale, Cook required that any structure on the parcel be made of "light-colored stone". McKim, Mead & White were hired as the architects for both Cook's house at 973 Fifth Avenue and Payne Whitney's at 972 Fifth Avenue, and the firm filed plans for both houses around the same time. In September 1902, McKim, Mead & White submitted plans to the Manhattan Bureau of Buildings for a six-story marble-and-granite house at 972 Fifth Avenue, which would cost $195,000.

The Real Estate Record and Guide indicated in February 1904 that the Payne Whitney House had been "enclosed". However, by that November, the windows and doors had not been installed yet. In April 1905, the same publication noted that the windows had been installed, but the entrance was unfinished and the interior work was underway. That June, the Elektron Manufacturing Company received the contract to install three dumbwaiters at the house. During the long period of construction, Helen gave birth to the Whitneys' two children, John (Jock) and Joan. Helen said to White: "It made me so disgusted I felt like chucking the whole thing and getting a nice ready-made house that I could have when I wanted it."

White carefully selected the house's decorations, even asking John Hay about the color of the marble in Helen's childhood house so it could be replicated. From 1903 to 1905, he spent much of his time in Europe to select antiques and art. This increased the total construction cost by $1 million, to Oliver Payne's consternation. When Oliver objected to the high cost of decorating the Payne Whitney House, White apologized, saying the house "was really of the first water and could stand in beauty with any house in the world". Ultimately, Oliver was compelled to forgive White. The Whitneys reportedly moved into the house in April 1906, although the house was "not yet completed", according to the New-York Tribune. White had finalized plans for the house's Venetian Room the same month. White ultimately never oversaw the completion of the Payne Whitney House, having been murdered that June. The house was completed in 1909.

=== Residential use ===
After the Whitneys moved into the house, they hosted several events, such as a Lent sewing club in 1907 and a dinner with music in 1908. Payne Whitney purchased a small parcel on the south side of the site, measuring 20 by 100 feet (6.1 by 30.5 m), from his neighbor James B. Duke in September 1909. Helen's mother Clara Stone Hay died at the house in 1914 while visiting her daughter and son-in-law. The house continued to host events including a speech on World War I fighting conditions in 1915, a "food bazaar" featuring a live pig in 1916, entertainments for schoolchildren during Christmas 1920, and a speech by conductor Kurt Schindler in 1924. The 1920 United States census indicated that fifteen servants lived with the four members of the Whitney family. Payne Whitney lived at 972 Fifth Avenue until his sudden death in 1927 at Greentree, the family estate in Manhasset, New York. In his will, Payne Whitney had bequeathed 972 Fifth Avenue to his wife.

Through the 1930s, Helen Hay Whitney continued to host social events, including a bazaar to benefit the unemployed, a fashion show for charity, and a supper dance honoring film producer David O. Selznick. In 1941, the Venetian Room's ceiling was restored. Helen continued to live in the house until her death in 1944. Helen had her favorite space in the mansion, the Venetian Room, removed and preserved before her death; the decorations were placed in 75 crates and stored at Greentree. She bequeathed the house to her son Jock. Soon afterward, the first floor was closed and its windows boarded up. On February 7 and 8, 1946, Parke-Bernet Galleries auctioned off many of the artworks, furnishings, and architectural design details. The auction grossed $31,119 on its first day and $70,267 on its second day, for a total of $101,386. Even after the auction, many original furnishings remained, and a caretaker was hired to maintain the furnishings. A tax appraisal filed in December 1948 appraised the 972 Fifth Avenue house at $140,000, out of a total estate of about $6.1 million.

In May 1949, Jock Whitney sold the house to a private investor, 972 Fifth Avenue Inc., in an all-cash transaction. The buyer, who was unidentified at the time, intended to convert the house into apartments. The next month, Jock officially turned the property title to 972 Fifth Avenue Inc. The mansion was assessed at the time at $507,000. 972 Fifth Avenue Inc. was headed by Lony Arnault, a Frenchwoman who headed who took out a loan from the Lurie Mortgage Corporation to fund the project. By February 1950, the building had been divided into 15 suites and two doctors' offices. That November, Sonnenblick Goldman Corporation placed a $160,000 first mortgage loan on the building. 972 Fifth Avenue Inc. transferred title to the building to Arnault in February 1951.

=== French Cultural Services ===
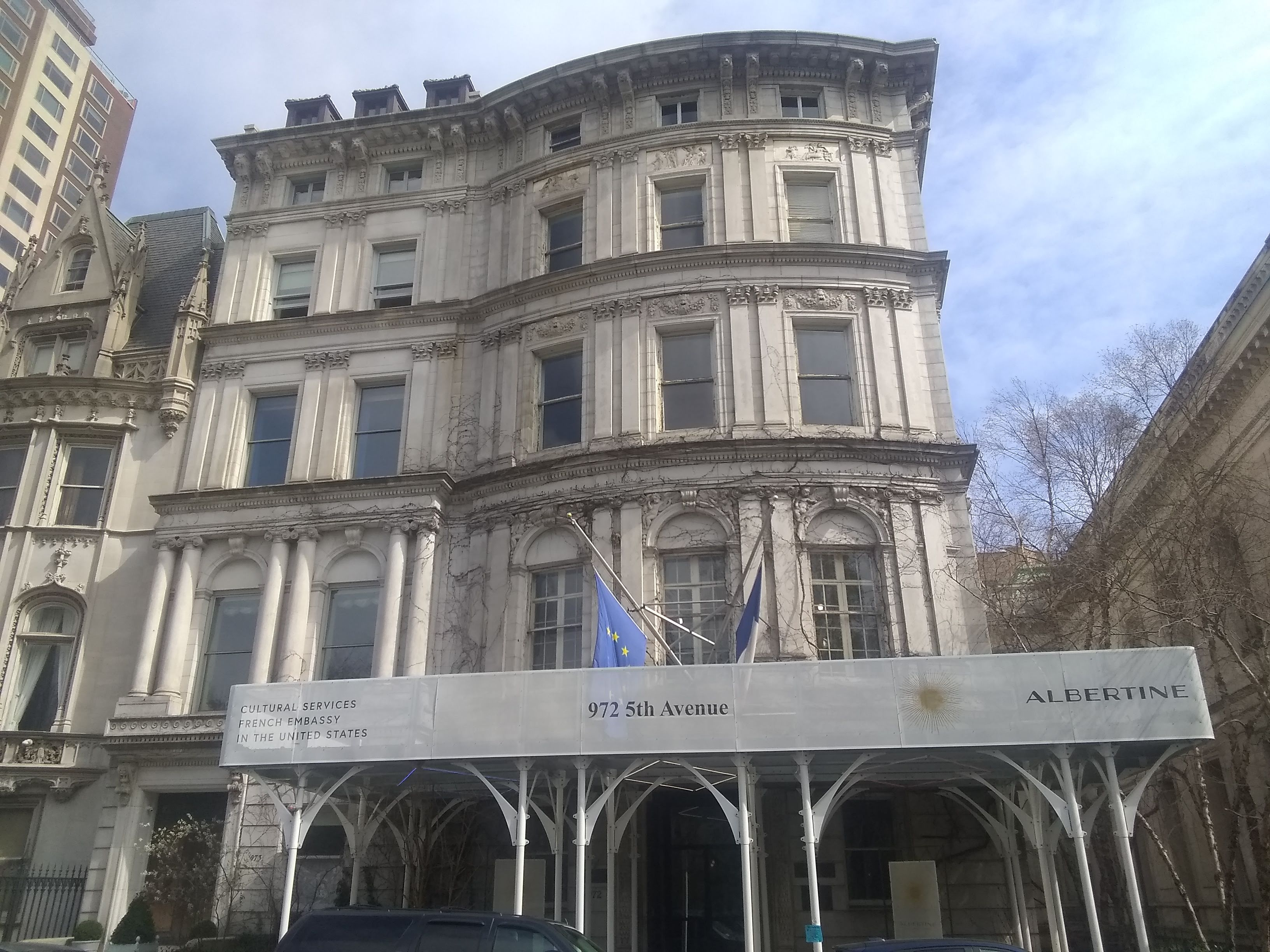
Seen in April 2021 with scaffolding outside it

Arnault transferred the building in May 1952 to the Title Guarantee and Trust Company, who in turn transferred it to the Republic of France, subject to two existing mortgages on the property. After the French government bought the Payne Whitney House, the building was used by the Cultural Services division of the French embassy to the United States. This made the Payne Whitney House one of a few embassy buildings outside a country's capital city. The French Embassy was operating two small private libraries in the house by mid-1953. By 1964, the French Cultural Services office was among the United States' busiest cultural-exchange buildings. The office directed exhibitions of French creative works, such as visual art and performances, in the United States.

As early as 1966, the New York City Landmarks Preservation Commission (LPC) was considering designating the Payne Whitney House as part of a city historic district. The LPC designated the house as a city landmark on September 15, 1970. The LPC also added the house, in 1977, to the Metropolitan Museum Historic District, a collection of 19th- and early 20th-century mansions around Fifth Avenue between 78th and 86th Streets. The roof and a section of the facade were renovated in 1980, followed by a portion of the ground floor in 1981. The restoration uncovered an artwork that had long been hidden in the ceiling. The house was restored in 1987, uncovering John La Farge's stained-glass window.

In 1997, Jock Whitney's widow Betsey Cushing Roosevelt Whitney donated the Venetian Room to the French-American Foundation, which in turn offered to help reinstall the room in its original location. Four layers of floor surfaces, the oldest dating from the 1950s, were removed as part of the restoration, and the physical space containing the room was repaired. Many of the original decorations remained in good condition after half a century; when the decorations were retrieved from a stable at Greentree, one restorer compared it to "opening up King Tut's tomb". The restoration was completed in April 1998. Among the other discoveries in the late 1990s was that of the statue in the rotunda which was authenticated in 1996 as a Michelangelo work. A dress worn by actress Marilyn Monroe was also discovered on the third floor around that time; it is unclear how the dress ended up in the house, since Monroe was not known to have visited the French Embassy.

The French Embassy celebrated the Payne Whitney House's centenary with a party in July 2006. The genuine Michelangelo statue in the rotunda was loaned to the Metropolitan Museum of Art in 2009, and a replica was installed in the rotunda. The Albertine Books bookstore and reading room opened in September 2014, functioning as a cultural space with public events. The Venetian Room was restored again in the late 2010s, reopening in 2018. The Venetian Room's restoration cost $250,000 and was partly funded by a $100,000 gift that the Selz Foundation had given to the World Monuments Fund. In June 2021, the French-American Foundation donated the Venetian Room to the French government.

== Reception ==
David Carrard Lowe, in a 1992 book about White's work, described the curved facade as having "an almost mannerist quality", emphasized by its vertical pilasters, horizontal entablatures, and cornices. In a 2008 book, White's great-grandson Samuel G. White wrote that the design of the house "illustrates [Stanford] White's ability with settings for elaborate social rituals and also with the patterns of family life".

Several publications praised the house's interior. Architecture magazine wrote that the decorations were "an illustration of his incomparable cleverness in discovering and purchasing antiques, valuable not only from a standpoint of their costliness, but also because of their intrinsic beauty". Town and Country magazine praised the Italian decorations as "a triumphant blending of decorative art, old and new". When the Venetian Room was restored in 1998, John Russell wrote for The New York Times that, while he considered the design "imperfect", "White's appetite for life is everywhere present, as is his sense of affectionate companionship". Lowe said that the smaller rooms "are among the most delightful of Stanford White's creations".

== See also ==
- List of New York City Designated Landmarks in Manhattan from 59th to 110th Streets
