= James S. Ackerman =

American architectural historian (1919–2016)

James Ackerman
- Born: James Sloss Ackerman; November 8, 1919; San Francisco, California, U.S.
- Died: December 31, 2016 (aged 97)

Academic background
- Education: Yale University

Academic work
- Discipline: Art history Architectural history

James Sloss Ackerman (November 8, 1919 – December 31, 2016) was an American architectural historian, a major scholar of Michelangelo's architecture, of Palladio and of Italian Renaissance architectural theory.

In 2017, Ackerman was awarded the Henry Hope Reed Award.

== Biography ==
Ackerman was born in San Francisco in November 1919. He studied at the Cate School in Carpinteria, California, graduating in 1937 before attending Yale University. At Yale, 1938–41, he came under the influence of Henri Focillon. His graduate work was at the Institute of Fine Arts, New York University (MA 1947, PhD 1952), where he studied with Richard Krautheimer and Erwin Panofsky. His studies were interrupted by his World War II service in the US Army in Italy, which, however, gave him an opportunity to increase his on-site understanding of Italian Renaissance architecture, his specialty—he was assigned to retrieve the archives secured at the Certosa di Pavia. He was a Fellow at the American Academy in Rome (1949–52). He taught at Berkeley and from 1960 at Harvard as Arthur Kingsley Porter Professor of Fine Arts until his retirement in 1990.

He was the editor of The Art Bulletin (1956–60) and Annali d'architettura. Ackerman was elected a Fellow of the American Academy of Arts and Sciences in 1963. He was a member of the American Philosophical Society, and a corresponding member of the British Academy, the Bavarian Academy of Sciences, the Accademia Olimpica, Vicenza, the Ateneo Veneto, the Accademia di San Luca in Rome and the Royal Society of Sciences in Uppsala. He gave the Slade Lectures at Cambridge in 1969–70. He received six honorary doctorates and was a Grand Officer of the Order of Merit of the Italian Republic, an honorary citizen of Padua, and received a Special Golden Lion Award at the Venice Biennale of Architecture of 2008.

When he started teaching at the UC Berkeley School of Architecture in the fall of 1952, Ackerman was their first full-time architectural historian.

His rigorous method set architecture in the broader contexts of cultural and intellectual history. He was awarded the Balzan Prize 2001 for achievement in architectural history and urbanism and the Paul Kristeller citation 2001 of the Renaissance Society of America for lifetime achievement. Ackerman conceived and narrated the films shot by John Terry Looking for Renaissance Rome (1975, with Kathleen Weil-Garris Brandt) and Palladio the Architect and His Influence in America (1980).

He died in December 2016 at the age of 97.

== Selected publications ==
Aside from numerous articles, Ackerman has written

- The Cortile del Belvedere (1954) This was based on his PhD dissertation on the Renaissance extension of the Vatican Palace.
- The Architecture of Michelangelo (2 vols., 1961; paperback version with condensed second volume, 1986) Volume I is a critical overview of the architect's practice and theory, and Vol. II an exhaustive catalogue of Michelangelo's mostly-unfinished buildings, employing architectural drawings and contemporary archival and graphic sources. The work received the Hitchcock Award of the Society of Architectural Historians.
- Palladio (series "Architect and Society") Pelican Books (1966; 1977, 2008) An introductory chapter "Palladio and his times" is followed by chapters discussing the examples of Palladio's villas, civic and domestic architecture, ecclesiastical architecture, and principles of his design and practice.
- Palladio's Villas (1967)
- The Villa: Form and Ideology of Country Houses (1990), an overview of the country house from Roman times to le Corbusier and Wright.
- James Ackerman Art Historian, 1992, book length interview for the Getty Foundation and U.C.L.A.
- Distance Points: Studies in Theory and Renaissance Art and Architecture, MIT Press (1991) Seven essays divided between the theory of criticism and the relation of architecture and science in the Renaissance, with individual studies of Leon Battista Alberti and Leonardo.
- Origins, Imitation, Conventions: Representation in the Visual Arts, MIT Press (2002) Twelve essays. For a full bibliography see his Google website.
