= Seminary Co-op =

Bookstore in Chicago, Illinois, United States

Coordinates: 41°47′24.69″N 87°35′51.88″W

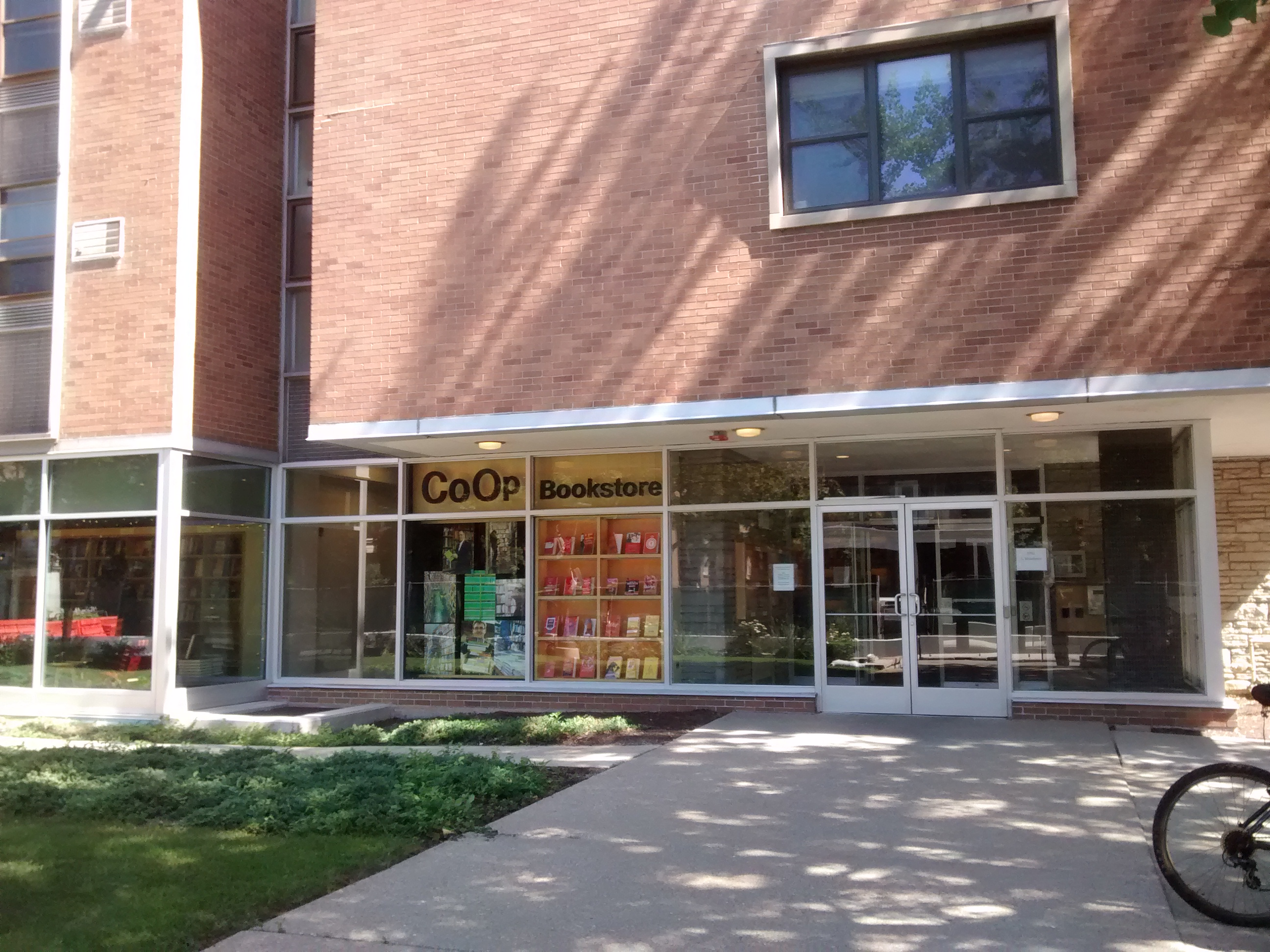
The Seminary Co-op in September 2014

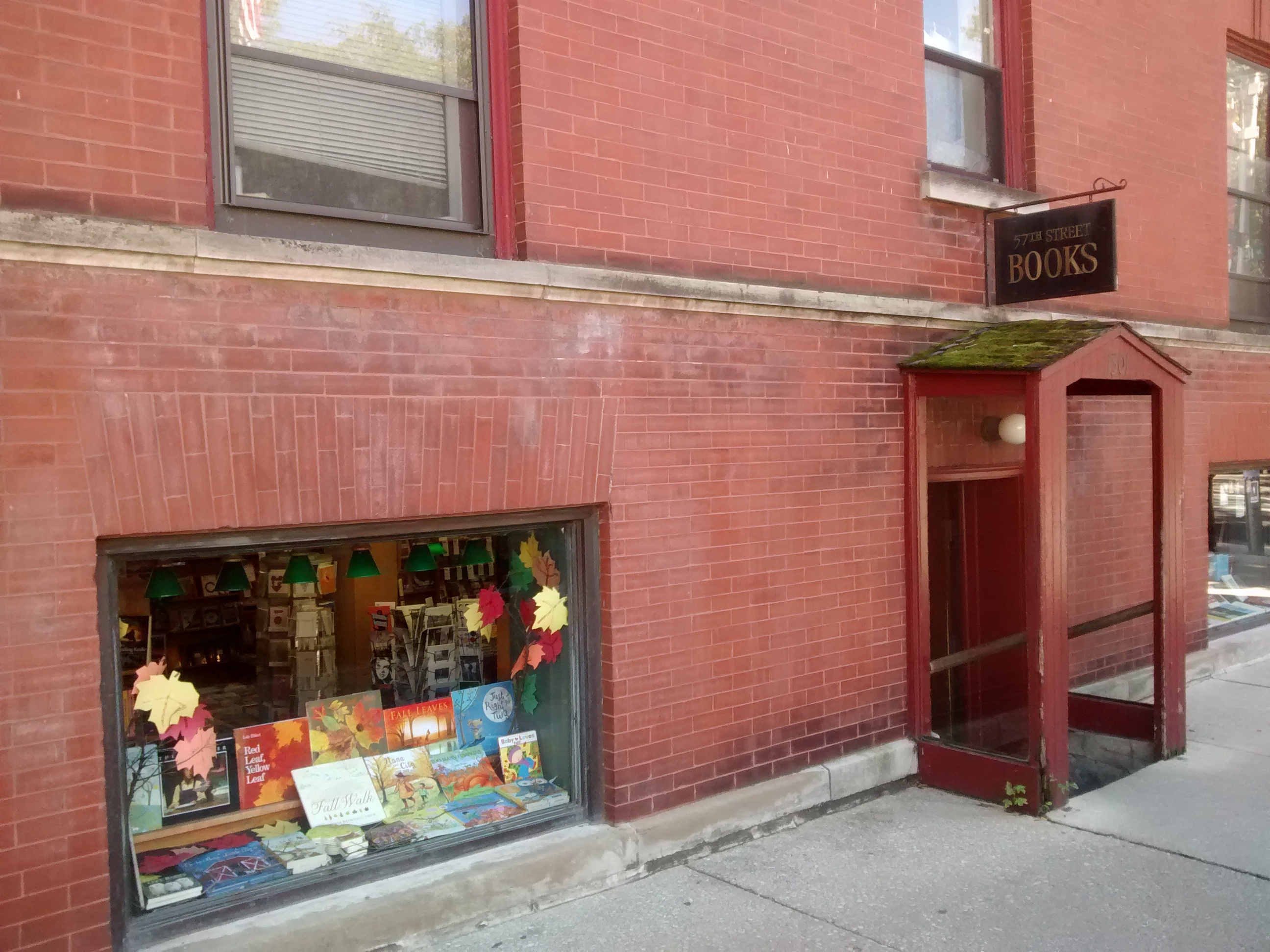
57th Street Books

Seminary Cooperative Bookstores, Inc., founded in 1961, is a not-for-profit bookstore with two branches in Chicago. Its flagship, known colloquially as the Seminary Co-op or simply the Sem Co-op, is located at 5751 S. Woodlawn Avenue. Prior to October 2012, it was located a block away in the basement of the Chicago Theological Seminary, next to the campus of the University of Chicago, and stocked the largest selection of academic volumes in the United States throughout an extensive maze of shelves.

The Co-op also operates 57th Street Books, also in the Hyde Park neighborhood, which houses a carefully curated collection of general interest titles, including kids' books, science fiction, mysteries and cookbooks.

The Co-op's reputation was so great that Columbia University invited manager Jack Cella to either open a branch in New York City or leave and open a new store there. Until the university gained its own neighborhood academic bookstore in the late 1990s, many Columbia scholars ordered books from the Co-op. Currently, the Co-op has over 53,000 members, 3,500 of whom are located overseas. The following countries have at least 100 members: Japan, the United Kingdom, Germany, Canada, and Australia. The following countries have at least 50 members: Taiwan, Spain, the Netherlands, Italy, Israel, Hong Kong, France, Brazil, and Korea. Other nations with significant membership include Sweden, Switzerland, Norway, Ireland, India, and Argentina.

In September 2008, the Co-op launched The Front Table, a web magazine for book lovers and Co-op members. Barack Obama's patronage of the bookstore garnered attention in the wake of his election.

In 2017 the Co-op announced that on April 1, 2017 it would take back the shares of "inactive members" who had not purchased anything in 2 years, unless they contacted the store and requested otherwise. In addition, the Co-op no longer requires the purchase of stock to become a member and receive 10% of monthly purchases in store credit.

In 2019, the Seminary Co-op Bookstores, Inc. became the country’s first not-for-profit bookstores whose mission is bookselling. As the stores' director Jeff Deutsch writes in his letter about the change, "Establishing the store as a not-for-profit (as opposed to its current status as a strict retail operation) also acknowledges the financial realities of our business model, which privileges cultural value over financial dividends. Our new structure codifies this mission, allowing us to invest in the browsing experience rather than overly concern ourselves with the vagaries of the market at a given moment."

In May of 2024, booksellers at the Seminary Co-op unionized, affiliating themselves with the Industrial Workers of the World. At the time of their unionization, they were the only unionized bookstore in the city of Chicago. Its longtime director, Jeff Deutsch, resigned in May of 2024.
