= Community Bookstore (Park Slope) =

Bookstore in Brooklyn, New York

Coordinates: 40.672673°N 73.976437°W

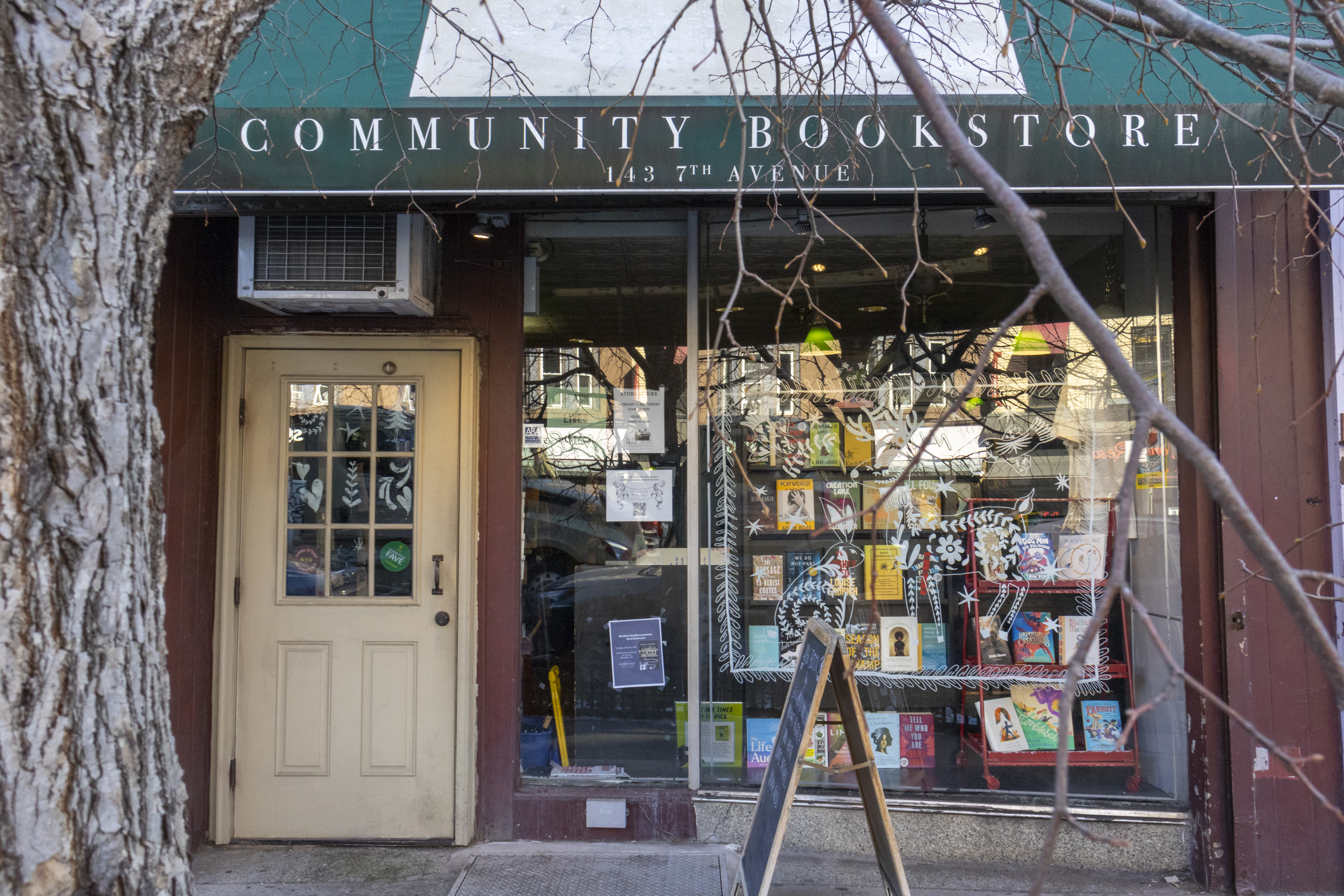
Storefront of the Park Slope Community Bookstore

Community Bookstore is a bookstore in the Park Slope neighborhood of Brooklyn, New York City open since 1971.

Susan Scioli and then-husband John Scioli opened the Community Bookstore in Park Slope in 1971. At the time, Park Slope was becoming a popular place for young people but the area did not yet have a strong commercial center. The Sciolis saw an opportunity, starting with a tiny store and building out. Then, in 1974 they opened a second location on Montague Street in Brooklyn Heights. When the couple separated in 1980, they each took one of the bookstores. Susan had the Park Slope shop and John took the Brooklyn Heights location, which he moved to Cobble Hill in the 1980s. John retired and closed the store in 2016, while the Park Slope location is still open as of 2023.

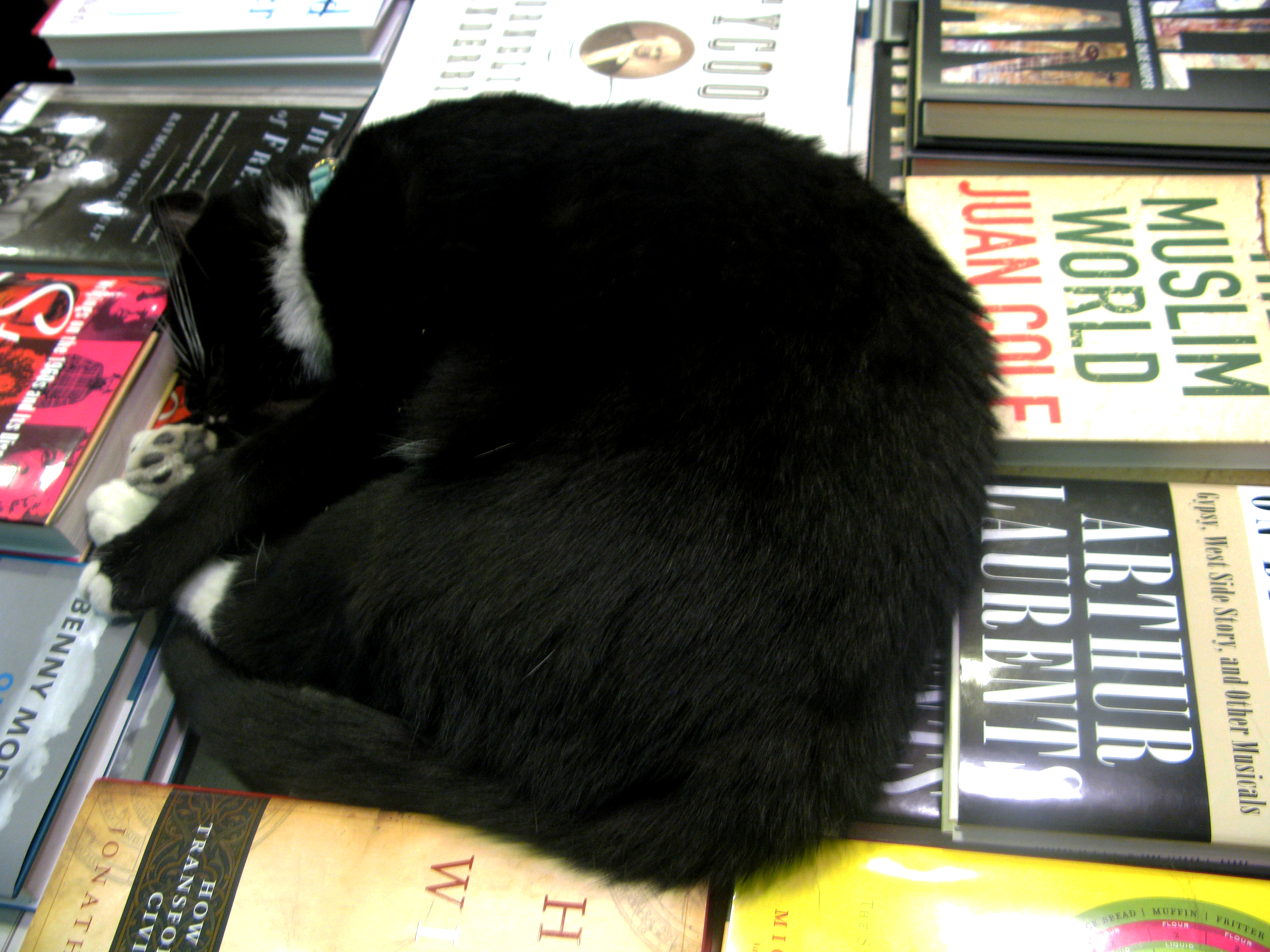
Tiny, a cat that lives in the bookstore

When Scioli learned of a Barnes & Noble store opening in the neighborhood in 1997, she quickly tried to adapt and compete with the giant competitor. According to the New York Times, "for her, staying competitive amounted to nothing short of war". She knocked down walls, expanded her inventory, built a cafe, developed a backyard reading space, and started a loyalty program/club.

Scioli ran the shop until 2001, when she sold it to Catherine Bohne, who had been acting as store manager. Bohne in turn sold it to Stephanie Valdez and Ezra Goldstein in 2010.

In 2013 the store expanded to a second location, Terrace Books, in Windsor Terrace.

The store gives local authors special attention, and holds regular literary events such as readings and panel discussions. For example, in 2016 actor John Turturro joined a panel about Elena Ferrante.

Bklyner described the bookstore as having an unusual atmosphere, with a number of animals having lived in the space, including a cat named Tiny the Usurper, an unofficial store mascot, as well as a bearded dragon, turtles, and a rabbit.
