= Community Bookstore (Cobble Hill) =

Bookstore in Brooklyn, New York

Coordinates: 40.6867°N 73.9938°W

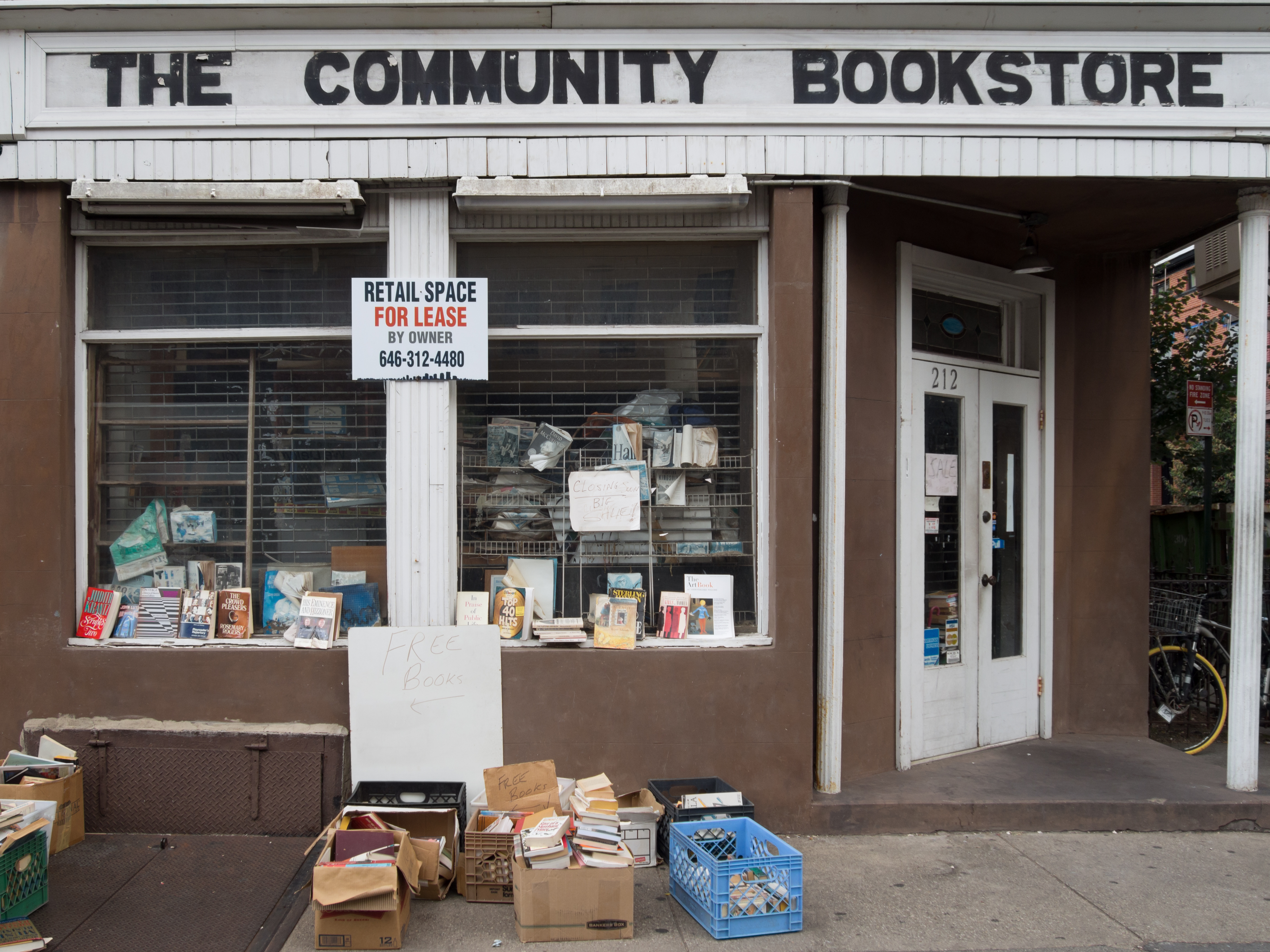
Community Bookstore storefront in June 2016, just prior to closing

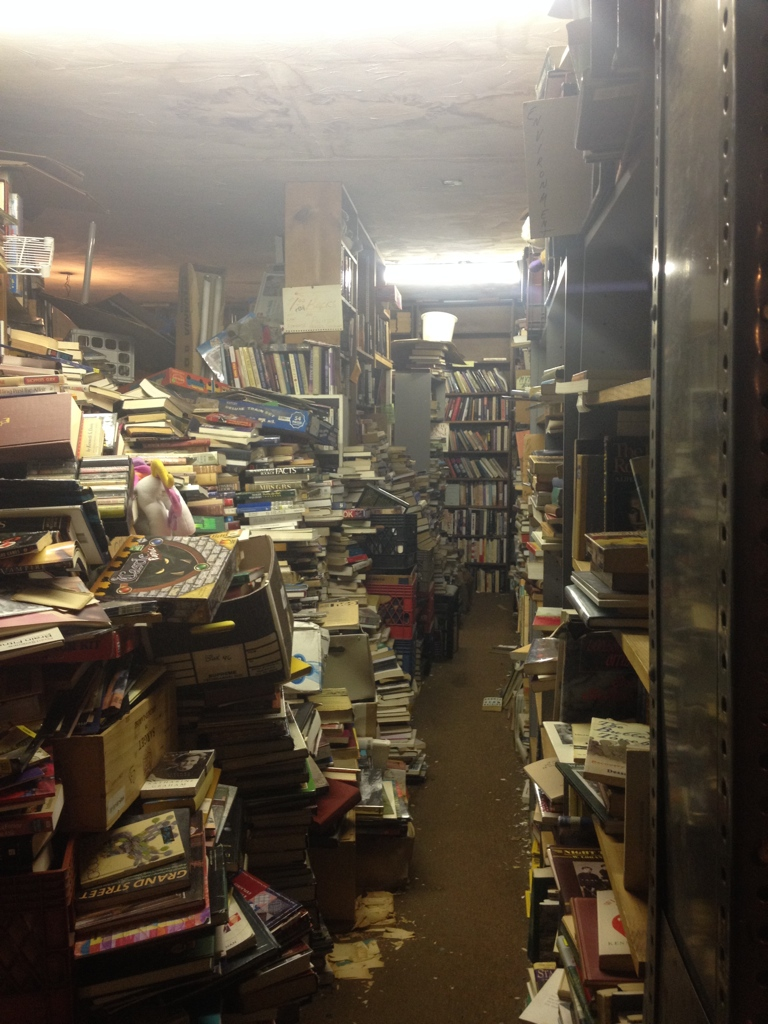
An interior view of the Community Bookstore taken mid-May 2016. The view faces the rear of the store's interior from a spot near the front entrance.

Community Bookstore was a bookstore in the Cobble Hill neighborhood of Brooklyn, New York. It opened in 1974 in Brooklyn Heights and moved to Cobble Hill after its rent spiked in 1985. Owner John Scioli operated it until retiring and closing the store in 2016. It was known as an atypical crowded bookstore filled to capacity with stacks of books accumulated via community donations.

== Description ==
The store's space was known for being filled with stacks of books to the point of posing a challenge to shoppers. The Wall Street Journal characterized it as a place where "books are stacked floor-to-ceiling" and "shelves filled with books rise above a floor piled waist-high with seemingly endless volumes. Underfoot, between paperbacks, worn carpeting can occasionally be glimpsed." The New York Times said that it's "not the kind of place one goes for the latest best sellers, literary magazines, a coffee or an author talk [but rather] a place to rummage and ruminate, a place for treasure hunters and lost souls as much as bibliophiles." And Gothamist described it as "a helter skelter labyrinth" and "one of the last 'messy bookstore' strongholds in New York", "almost impossible to maneuver...without knocking over stacks of books." Despite appearances, the tens of thousands of volumes were kept in sections and in some places alphabetized.

According to Scioli, the store was more orderly before his wife died in 2002. She was better able to turn away additional books. "I'll be the first to admit I’m a bit of a hoarder," he told the New York Times, "I was afraid I was going to die under a pile of books one of these days, and no one would ever find me."

At some point, people started donating books to the extent that he no longer had to purchase any.

Scioli was an unconventional bookstore manager with an "acerbic wit", known for sitting in a chair in front of the store, smoking cigarettes, quoting prices that sometimes seemed arbitrary, and uninterested in giving recommendations. The shop's hours moved later and later, largely open when Scioli wanted to, and typically only after 5:00 PM, sometimes staying open past midnight.

== History ==
John Scioli and then-wife Susan Scioli opened the first Community Bookstore in Park Slope, Brooklyn, in 1971. At the time, Park Slope was becoming a popular place for young people but the area did not yet have a strong commercial center. The Sciolis saw an opportunity, starting with a tiny store and building out. Then, in 1974 they opened a second location on Montague Street in Brooklyn Heights.

Scioli is a New York City native, born in Manhattan's Little Italy to an Italian immigrant parents. He worked in retail and as a cab driver before entering the bookselling business. According to John, it was Susan, a former teacher, who had the literature background; he became more of an avid reader only after opening the bookstores. When the couple separated in 1980, they each took one of the bookstores. John had the Brooklyn Heights location and Susan ran the Park Slope shop until 2001, selling it to Catherine Bohne, who in turn sold it to Stephanie Valdez and Ezra Goldstein in 2010.

=== Fight over commercial rent control ===
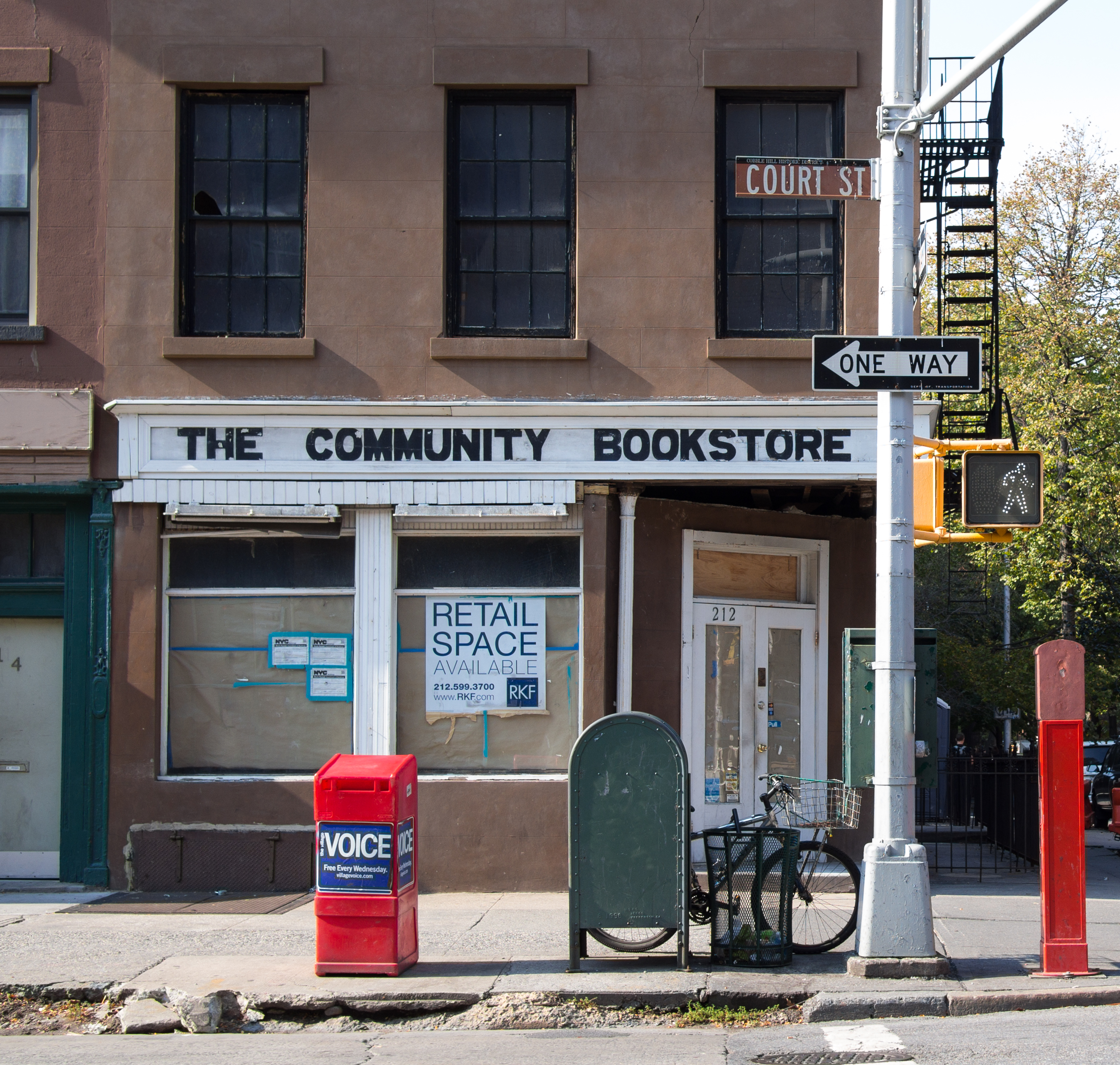
Storefront in October 2016, after closing

John's Brooklyn Heights location became a central figure in the mid-1980s when his landlord evicted Scioli at the end of his lease in order to rent the space to an ice cream parlor that had agreed to pay more than double Scioli's rent. Brooklyn Heights is an affluent neighborhood, and with rents rising rapidly, the bookstore received press coverage as representative of a broader phenomenon of smaller, older businesses being priced out of New York neighborhoods. Scioli became embroiled in legal fights with his landlord over the eviction and the conflict fomented community action rallying around Scioli. Then mayor Ed Koch opposed commercial rent protection, so in response Scioli made a show of marking up the price of Koch's 1984 autobiographical book, Mayor, to three times its list price.

When the company that wanted to open the ice cream parlor backed out of the deal, the landlord sued them, along with Scioli, for more than $42 million in damages for "having arranged protest demonstrations, letter-writing campaigns, news media exposure, threats of violence, threats of economic boycott, political and community pressure, and coercion and violent protests." The landlord's lawyer characterized Scioli's actions as "a campaign of terror". According to Scioli, the only "protest" he participated in was what he called a "meltdown", whereby 10 ice cream cones were put on display outside the store and left to melt all over a shelf of books. The New York chapter of the American Civil Liberties Union stepped in to defend Scioli's freedom of speech.

=== Cobble Hill ===
Even without eviction, some rise in rent was unavoidable in Brooklyn Heights, so Scioli looked for an affordable location to buy rather than rent, and found a building at the corner of Court Street and Warren Street in nearby Cobble Hill. The shop operated at that location from 1985 until its closing upon Scioli's retirement in 2016. At the time, he remarked that he had "tried to go out of business two or three times" before, unable to "believe people still put up with this place. But no matter what I did, people just kept buying books." He sold the building for more than ten times what he originally paid for it.

== Film ==
John Scioli and the bookstore were the subject of a short New Yorker documentary in 2016, Booklyn, by Paul Szynol.
