= Goodlake =

Goodlake is a surname. Notable people with the surname include:

- Emilia Jane Goodlake Webb (19th century), mother of ethnographer Augusta Zelia Fraser, sister of General Gerald Goodlake VC, wife of William Frederick Webb
- Lieutenant-General Gerald Goodlake VC (1832–1890), Crimean War veteran
- Olivia Elizabeth Goodlake (19th century), mother of Guy de Lasteyrie, 5th Marquis de Lasteyrie du Saillant
- Thomas Goodlake (14th century), Member of Parliament for Middlesex (UK Parliament constituency) in 1397
- Thomas Mills Goodlake (19th century), father of General Gerald Goodlake VC, grandfather of Augusta Zelia Fraser, father-in-law of William Frederick Webb

== See also ==
- Goodlake Arms, East Challow, Vale of White Horse, Oxfordshire, England, UK; a public house (pub)
- Good Lake, Saskatchewan, Canada; a municipality
- Good (disambiguation)
- Lake (disambiguation)
