= Chuma and Susi =

African explorers working with David Livingstone

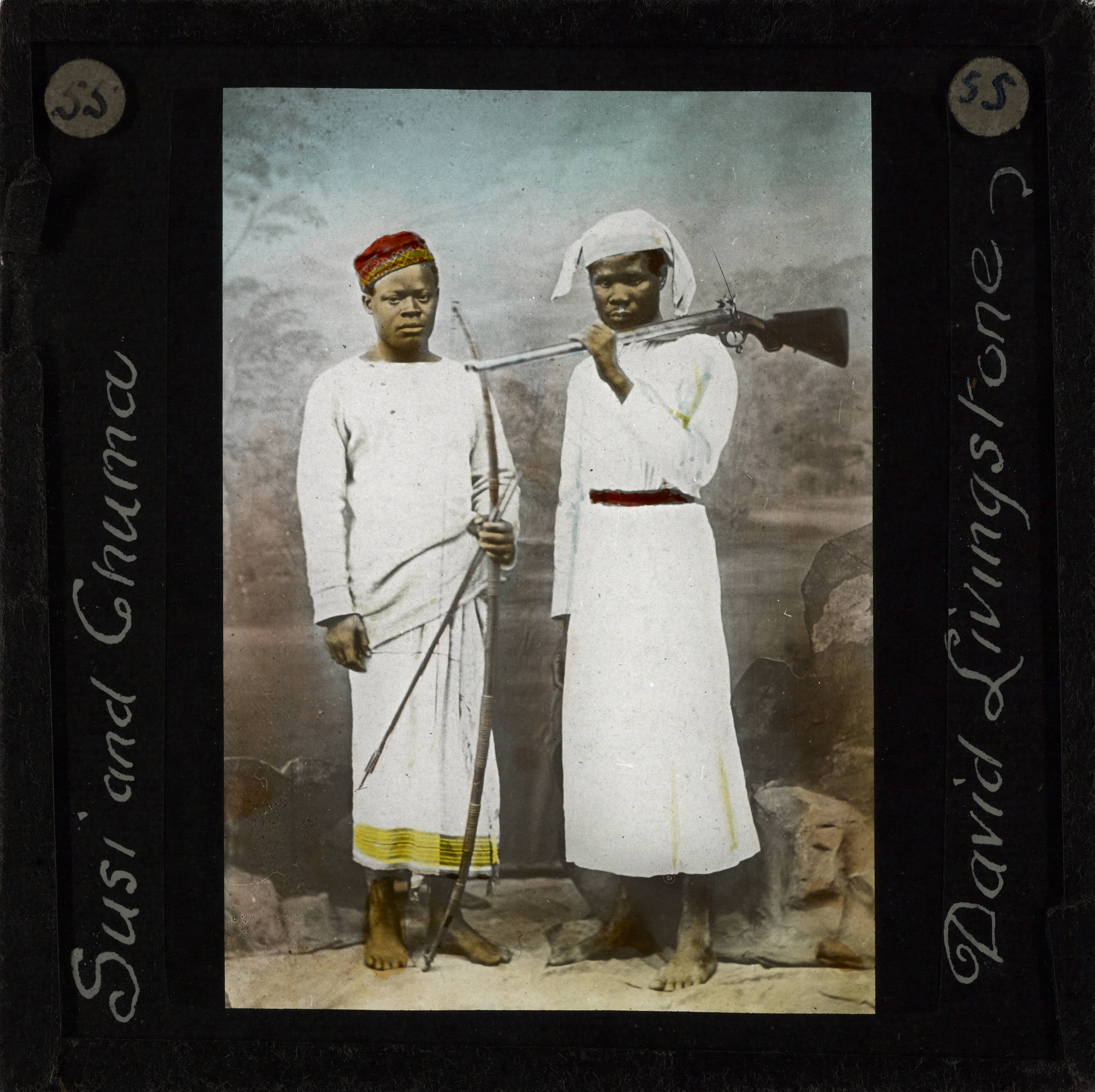
James Chuma and Abdullah Susi in their usual clothing

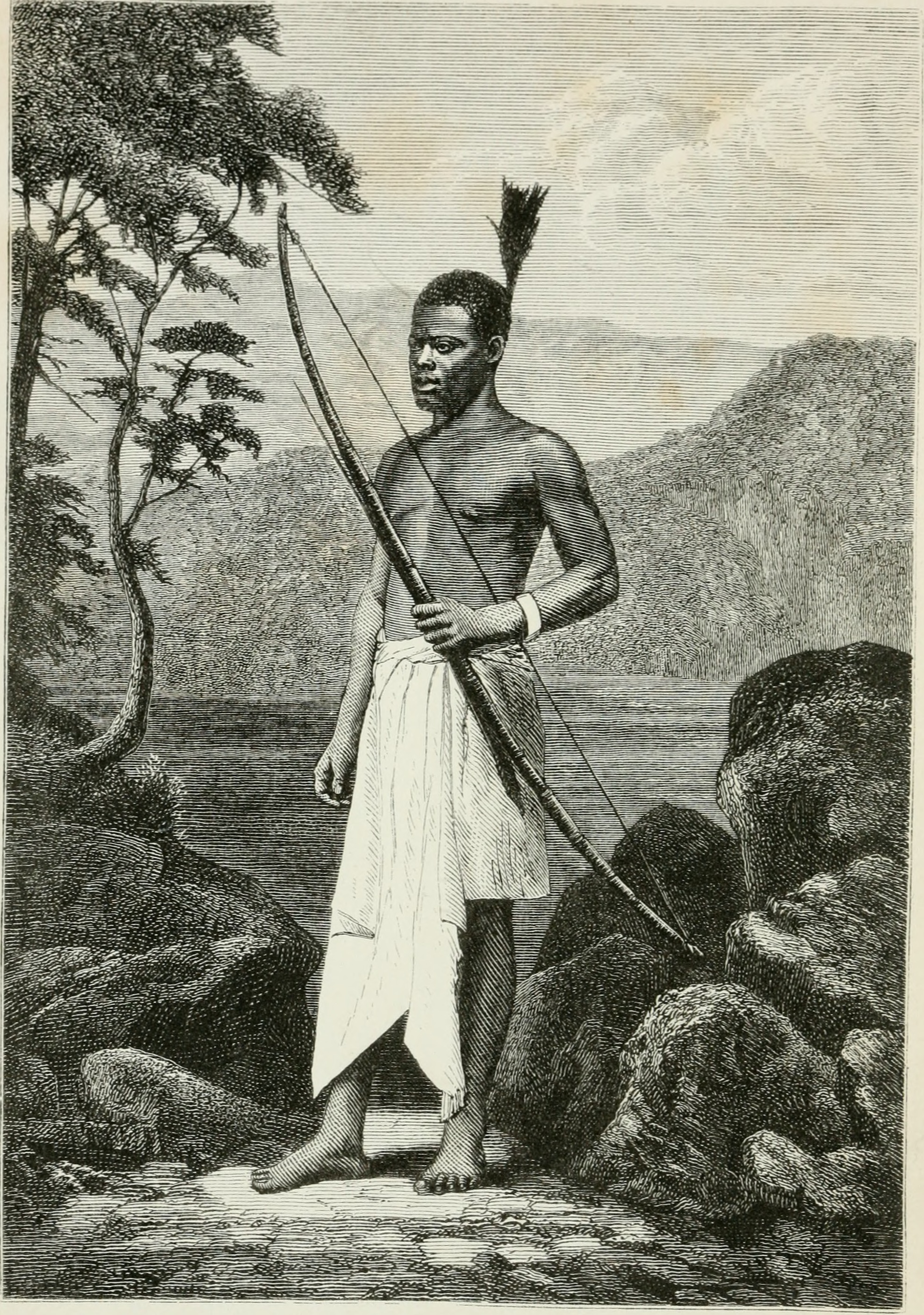
In the London studio of Henry Maull & Co., Chuma portrayed as expected by the British public

James Chuma (d. 1882) and David Susi (d. 1891) were men from central Africa who took part in the second Zambezi expedition led by the explorer David Livingstone, and were employed by him in his last expedition. They had significant roles in organisation and were the first to greet Henry Morton Stanley when his search party made contact.

They supported Livingstone on his last travels, and after his death they played a leading role in taking his body to the coast for return to Britain. In 1874 they went to Britain, visiting his family and friend and benefactor James Young, and helped Horace Waller with his task of transcribing and editing The Last Journals of David Livingstone in Central Africa, contributing their own memories for notes of clarification and for the period after Livingstone's last journal entry.

== Background ==
David Livingstone, missionary doctor, explored the Zambezi and crossed the continent to Luanda. He was fluent in Tswana language, and king Sekeletu assigned Kololo people to assist and guide him along established caravan routes. He returned in 1856 to acclaim from the Royal Geographical Society, and his Missionary Travels published in 1857 was a bestselling travelogue with exceptionally sympathetic descriptions of African people. He raised public demand for missions and "legitimate commerce" by river into central Africa to end the increasing horrors of slave trading.

The East African slave trade dated back thousands of years. Arabs mingled with Africans along the Swahili coast, and their caravan trade routes extended over 1,000 miles (1,600 km) across the country. Many traders were Afro-Arabs, notably Tippu Tip, operating from Zanzibar. In addition, Portuguese and Afro-Portuguese landowners exported slaves to Brazil. Livingstone noted slave trading by "Manganja" (Mang'anja) and "Waiyau" (Yao) African people, but this "strange idea of property in man that permits him to be sold to another" was not held by others such as the Xhosa, Zulu and Tswana people.

== Zambezi and Shire ==
In December 1857 the Foreign Office proposed an expedition. Livingstone had envisaged another solo journey with African helpers, in January 1858 he agreed to lead a second Zambesi expedition with six specialist officers, hurriedly recruited in the UK. The prefabricated river steamer Ma Robert was quickly built and on 10 March taken with the expedition on a Colonial Office steamer which arrived at the Zambezi on 14 May. There were delays getting up the shallow river, Ma Robert had to make repeated slow journeys with supplies, getting hauled across shoals. The riverbanks were a war zone, with Portuguese soldiers and their slaves fighting the Chikunda slave-hunters of Matakenya (Mariano), but both sides accepted the expedition as friends.

=== Abdullah Susi ===
Susi worked on the Zambezi at Shupanga as a riverman. Livingstone referred to him as a Shupanga man, he has been described as being of the Shupanga tribe. Around 1858, he was employed in the service of Major Tito Sicard, the Belgian Commandant of Tete, who was stationed in Shupanga during the Mariano war. At Tete in 1856, Sicard and Captain Nunes had given generous assistance to Livingstone (and his Kololo men) who became starved getting there.

The Ma Robert reached Shupango on 4 August 1858. This was the first time Susi met Livingstone, who had been welcomed by his old friends Sicard and Nunes, after they "put their good-will into action, by cutting wood [as fuel] for the steamer and sending men to help in unloading." The steamer, with Livingstone, left for Tete on 17 August.

=== Chuma ===
Chuma (also written as Chumah or Juma), was born to Chimilengo, who was a proficient fisherman, and Chinjeriapi, Yao people who lived in Kusogwe near Lake Nyassa. While still only a boy, he was sold for two bundles of fish to become a Portuguese slave. Livingstone understood that Chuma had been sold by his own "Waiyau" (Yao people), but in 1866 Chuma believed that he had been caught and sold by the Mang'anja, and disputed that others had been sold by their own Yao relatives.

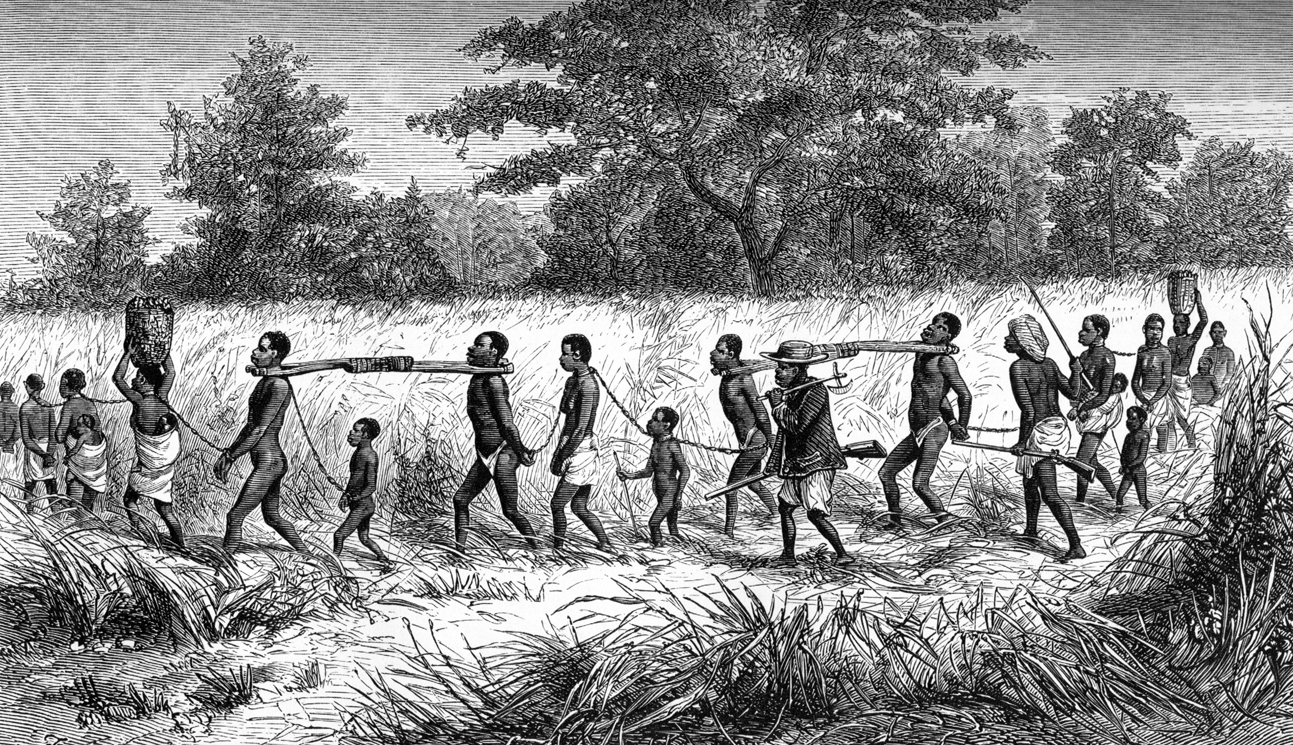
Captives and black slave-drivers, nearing Mbame’s village.

In July 1861, when Chuma was around 11 years old, he was freed from slavery by Livingstone's expedition and the Universities' Mission to Central Africa (UMCA) led by Bishop Charles MacKenzie.

The Colonial Office had provided the expedition with Pioneer, a new wooden paddle survey vessel. Both the Bishop and Horace Waller of the UMCA helped energetically in getting the ship up the Zambesi and Shire River to Chibisa's village. On 15 July they set off on foot for the Shire Highlands. Next day, they reached the village of Mbame, where they were approached by "a long line of manacled men, women, and children" being marched along by black slave-drivers who scattered when they saw the Europeans. The leader, "a well-known slave of the late Commandant at Tette", had served Livingstone there on the previous expedition. He claimed to have bought the slaves, but most said they had been captured in war. The expedition freed the slaves, including Chuma, and told them they could now go where they pleased. All chose to be attached to the Mission.

MacKenzie set up a Mission Station at Magomero as an interim measure until he had more local knowledge, he "commenced learning the language, Mr. Waller began building, and Mr. Scudamore improvised a sort of infant school for the children". The expedition left them and Livingstone extended exploration to Lake Nyassa, but found increasing problems of Portuguese and Zanzibar slave raiding, and conflict between Yao, Kololo, Mang'anja and Ngoni people. In January 1862 MacKenzie lost his medicine kit and, without quinine, caught malaria and died. On 6 May the UMCA moved its Mission back down to Chibisa's.

=== Shupanga to Shire and Bombay ===
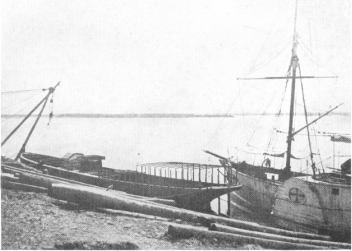
Lady Nyasa and Pioneer at Shupanga, December 1862.

Susi and his friend Amoda joined Livingstone's expedition at Shupanga in 1863, to cut wood as fuel for the Pioneer.

Livingstone had raised funds for a replacement river steamer, Lady Nyasa. It was shipped out in sections and assembled at Shupanga. When Pioneer returned in December 1862 from investigating the Ruvuma River, they paid (in cloth) their "Mazaro men" who left and engaged replacements. On 10 January 1863 they set off, towing Lady Nyasa as its engine was incomplete, and went up the Shire River past scenes of devastation as Mariano's Chikunda slave-hunts left corpses floating downstream. They reached Chibisa's and the Murchison Cataracts in April, then began dismantling Lady Nyasa and building a road to take its sections past the cataracts.

On 26 June, Bishop William Tozer arrived as the new head of the UMCA. He brought government orders ending the expedition, so Lady Nyasa was reassembled and its engine installed. The mission and Waller moved to Tozer's new base downriver on Mount Morrumbala, then learnt that the mission was moving to Zanzibar, taking only some "teachable boys", abandoning 13 women and children, and 25 young men. Waller resigned to look after them, and when the river became navigable in January, Livingstone collected them as he brought the ships downriver. At the Zambesi mouth the ships were towed to Mozambique. Pioneer took Waller and most of the party to Cape Town.

Rather than sell Lady Nyasa where it could be used by slave traders, Livingstone took the tiny river steamer on to Zanzibar, then on 31 April 1864 set off for the 2,500 miles (4,000 km) voyage under sail to Bombay. The small crew included Susi and Amoda, as well as the two boys Chuma and Wakotani. Remarkably, they made it to India on 12 June, a day's sail from Bombay. Livingstone arranged education for the boys and some of the crew at John Wilson's Free Church College, and got jobs in the docks for other crew members including Susi. He then went back to Britain to organise another expedition.

Livingstone returned to Bombay to recruit expedition members. He was present on 10 December 1865 when the boys were baptised by John Wilson, and Chuma became James Chuma.

== Search for the source of the Nile ==
Livingstone's reputation had been damaged by reports of failure, but he still saw himself as a missionary using exploration to spread Christianity and commerce, and thus end slavery. He still had a lot of public support, and in Britain took up the suggestion from Roderick Murchison of the Royal Geographical Society of exploring water systems, hoping to establish the source of the Nile. Government support was minimal, but he was given significant funding by his friend since university, James "Paraffin" Young.

He returned on 11 September 1865 to Bombay, where he recruited four of his previous crew members; "two Shupanga men" (Susi and Amoda), and the "two Wayaus, Wakatani and Chuma". From the Nassick African Asylum for freed slaves, he engaged nine lads recommended by Sir Bartle Frere, Governor of Bombay. Frere also provided 12 sepoys of the Bombay Marine Battalion under a havildar (corporal), and use of a ship to Zanzibar. Helped by the British Consul at Johanna, Livingstone hired ten Comoro Islanders he referred to as "Johanna men". Their leader, known as Ali Moosa or Musa, had been a crew member on Pioneer during the Zambesi expedition.

=== Mikindani to Ujiji ===
He had 36 men; expeditions at this time usually exceeded 100. A Royal Navy ship landed them at Mikindani near the Ruvuma River on 24 March 1866, and he hired more porters there. As previously, Livingstone focussed on his own interests and neglected organisation. "Mazitu" (Ngoni) raids left food scarce, and corpses marked the route of Zanzibar slavers. On 11 June the Mikandam porters refused to go further, the increasingly undisciplined sepoys were paid off in July.

Wakatani and Chuma translated for Livingstone at a Wayau village, where all had "heard of our wish to stop the slave-trade, and [were] rather taken aback when told that by selling they are part and part guilty" of the deaths – "If they did not sell, the Arabs would not come to buy." A Zanzibari slave trader whose large caravan stopped at the next village gave Livingstone and his men food, and asked about English efforts to end the trade. He helpfully took correspondence on to the consul. Livingstone came to be on good terms with several of these traders, while openly trying to end slavery.

Livingstone wrote to Waller "Chuma and Wikatani are very good boys but still boys utterly". Around 16 years old, they were showing "excessive levity", as when laughing so hard at jokes that they did not notice the villagers telling the jokes stealing "fork, kettle, pot, and shot-pouch", most of which were recovered for the expedition by their chief. Livingstone's attempts to train them as domestic servants met "an inveterate tendency to lose my things & preserve their own", and they had to be shouted at to prepare breakfast on time. Wakotani, if not giggling or smoking bange and screaming, "was sure to be singing Dididey dididey or Weeweewee".

Their caravan passed to the south of Lake Nyassa in late September. At M'Ponda's village, Wakotani said he had met a brother, his father who sold him into slavery was dead, and he wanted to stay with his relatives. Livingstone had told the Waiyau chiefs that slaves he liberated "never became our slaves, and were at liberty to go back to their relatives if they liked; and now it was impossible to object to Wikatani going without stultifying my own statements." Apparently Wakotani tried to persuade Chuma to join him, but Livingstone advised Chuma that this could be a trick to enslave him. A few days later, after passing Cape Maclear, a woman questioned Chuma about his family, then persuaded him that she was his aunt. "He wanted to give her at once a fathom of calico and beads, and wished me to cut his pay down for the purpose. I persuaded him to be content with a few beads for her", and he gave her some other valuables. "It shows a most forgiving disposition on the part of these boys to make presents to those who, if genuine relations, actually sold them."

Near Cape Maclear the Johanna men left them, on a rumour of Mazitu threatening the way ahead. Only Susi, Chuma, Amoda and eight Nassik men continued with Livingstone, who repeatedly hired local porters for a few weeks at a time. They struggled on in torrential rain, at times had difficulty getting food, and were joined by two Yao who had been sold as slaves, "but the Mazitu killed all their Manganja masters & now they are free so we engage them". Disastrously, these men ran away on 20 January 1867, stealing baggage including the quinine supply. Livingstone felt he "had now received the sentence of death, like poor Bishop MacKenzie".

Despite difficulties, the small group continued, exploring areas not seen by Europeans, with generous assistance from local Africans and from Zanzibari traders. From April Livingstone was protected by his "faithfuls" during many long bouts of illness including malaria. In November he was infuriated when several ran away with some supplies, and he refused to reinstate "the thief Suzi for he is quite inveterate, and Chuma who ran away 'to be with Suzi' and I who rescued him from slavery, and had been at the expense of feeding and clothing him for years was nobody in his eyes. 'Bange' and black women overcame him, and I feel at no inclination to be at further expense and trouble for him." After he had "taken all the runaways back again", he noted that they had not taken advantage of his dependence on them, and "Have faults myself". At some point he grumbled that his servants "acted like the Irish helps in America. The lack of a chain to confine them emboldens them." After another rebellion in April 1868, he "did not blame them very severely in my own mind for absconding: they were tired of tramping, and so verily am I".

=== Meeting with Stanley ===
When the Johanna men had reached Zanzibar at the end of 1866, their tale that Livingstone had been murdered aroused international interest. A British expedition investigated and in 1868 reported this was untrue. The reporter Henry Stanley was sent to Aden then, after covering other stories, arrived in Zanzibar in 1871 and recruited a large expedition. This reached Ujiji around the end of October and announced his arrival with gunfire, alarming Livingstone's cook Halima (Amoda's wife) who rushed to tell him.

Susi ran to Livingstone and said "An Englishman! I see him!", then darted off. His greeting "Good morning, sir!" startled Stanley, who asked "Who the mischief are you?", and was told "I am Susi, the servant of Dr. Livingstone". After Chuma gave the same greeting and his name, Stanley asked "What! are you Chumah, the friend of Wekotani?". After Livingstone and Stanley met, they sat talking. Halima "was in a state of the greatest excitement. She had been protruding her head out of the cookhouse to make sure that there were really two white men sitting down in the veranda, when there used to be only one, who would not, because he could not, eat anything", to her great concern. Now, she gossiped to a crowd outside her kitchen, explaining the news.

=== Bangweulu Wetlands, death of Livingstone ===
Feeling better, Livingstone explored the area with Stanley, then rejected his urging to return home. Determined to find the Nile's sources, Livingstone waited at Tabora after Stanley left on 14 March 1872, having asked him to "send men, not slaves, from the coast". At least three women chose to continue with him rather than go to the coast: Amoda's wife Halima, Susi's wife Mochosi, and Ntaoéka. Livingstone reassured Halima after a quarrel, and noted that "She is always very attentive and clever, and never stole, nor would she allow her husband to steal", adding "I shall free her, and buy her a house and garden at Zanzibar, when we get there." He "did not like to have a fine-looking woman among us unattached", so arranged for Ntaoéka to marry Chuma.

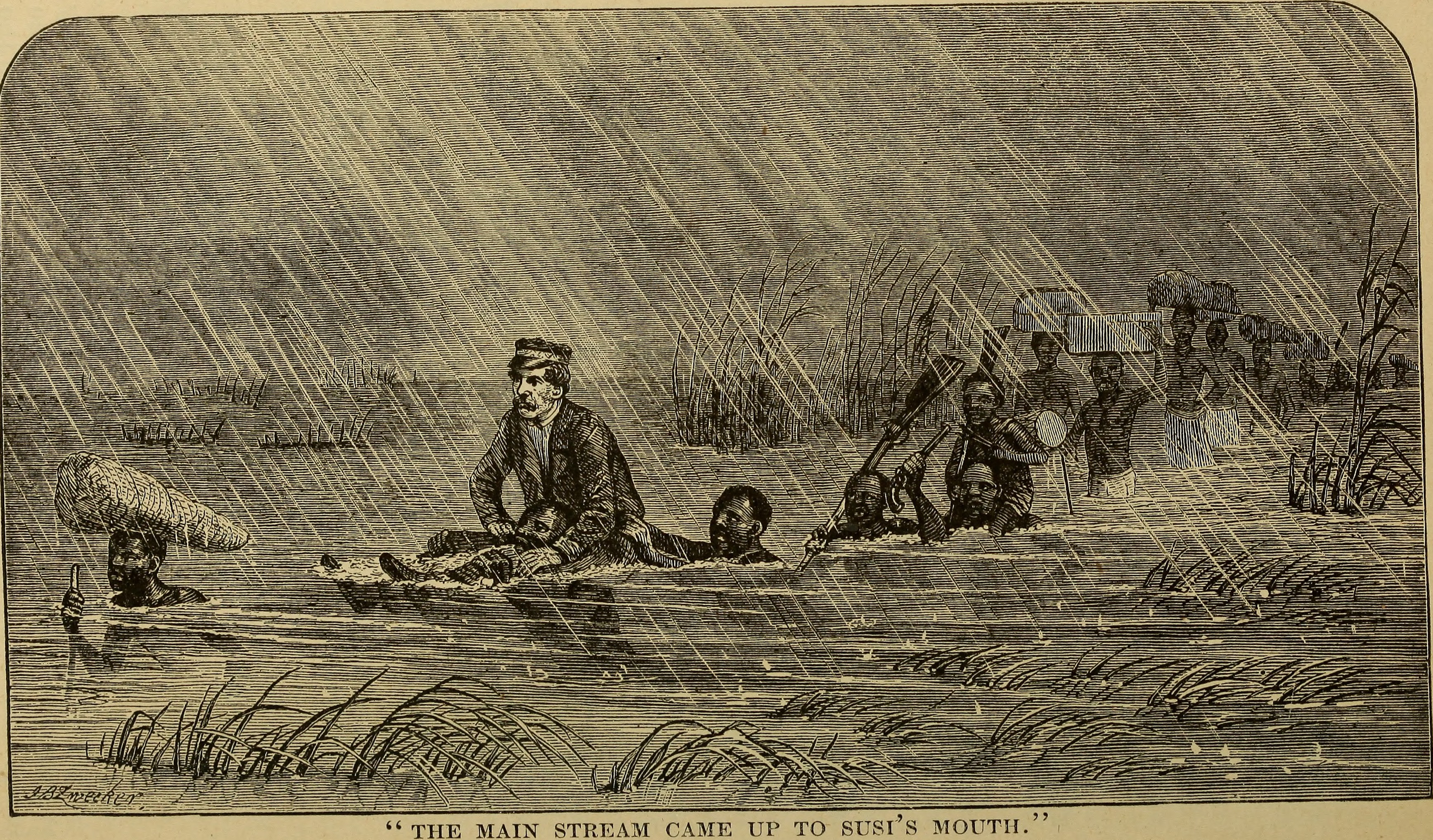
"The main stream came up to Susi's mouth"

The expedition was down to just five of those recruited at its start: Susi, Chuma, Amoda, and the Nassick lads Mabruki and Gardner. On 14 August 57 more arrived, mostly porters engaged by Stanley, as well as some Nassick boys, including Jacob Wainwright, who had been recruited for the "Livingstone Search and Relief Expedition" which had decided not to go further when it met Stanley at the coast. Livingstone attempted to go round Lake Bangweulu which he thought had a defined coast, but increasingly he struggled with illness and difficulty navigating across the spongy marshes of the Bangweulu Wetlands. In January 1873, men including Susi and Chuma carried Livingstone across rivers. His tent failed, and the men built huts for him. From 22 April, he was carried in a kitanda.

At the end of April they reached Chitambo's village and built a hut for Livingstone, who was too ill to speak to Chitambo the next morning. Livingstone was attended by Majwara and Susi, who gave him his medication shortly before midnight, but he died during the night. Susi and Chuma gathered the men together to witness Livingstone's boxes being opened for listing and were given unanimous agreement that they were to act as chiefs and captains of the caravan. Knowing the customs around death, they agreed to set up an isolated hut for Livingstone, then Chitambo said "Why did you not tell me the truth? I know that your master died last night. You were afraid to let me know, but do not fear any longer". Members of the party carried out an autopsy, and in a Christian ceremony Livingstone's heart was buried in tin box under a mvula tree. The body was crudely embalmed and dried for a fortnight before being cased in a bark cylinder for the long journey to the coast to return it to Britain.

There were difficulties on this journey of over 1,000 miles (1,600 km), with a battle when drunken villagers refused passage and delays due to illness including a few days when Susi's wife had to be carried in a kitanda. They heard reports that the Livingstone East-Coast Aid Expedition (led by Verney Lovett Cameron) was at the Arab town of Unyanyembé, so Wainwright wrote a letter which Chuma and three men took to Cameron. Both groups met up at the settlement of Kwihara, not far from Tabora. Cameron tried to get them to bury Livingstone locally and insisted on taking charge of his navigation instruments. They carried his body to Bagamoyo (on the coast of modern-day Tanzania) where it was handed over to the British authorities and transported to London for burial.

== Visit to Britain ==
The Universities' Mission to Central Africa expected Susi and Chuma to be invited to travel with Livingstone's body from Africa. When the situation was realised, James Young provided funding for them to make the trip, but they missed the state funeral held on 18 April. Murray the publisher noted "Chuma & Susi are to be paid at the rate of £5 per month in lieu of wages during their stay in England." On 29 May 1874 Waller announced to the National Temperance League annual meeting (attended by Stanley and Livingstone's son Tom) that Susi and Chuma had arrived at London docks that day but were "not presentable due to lack of clothes" so had not come along. At a Royal Geographical Society meeting the next day, Sir Henry Bartle Frere introduced Susi and Chuma, praising them for "duties strenuously performed".

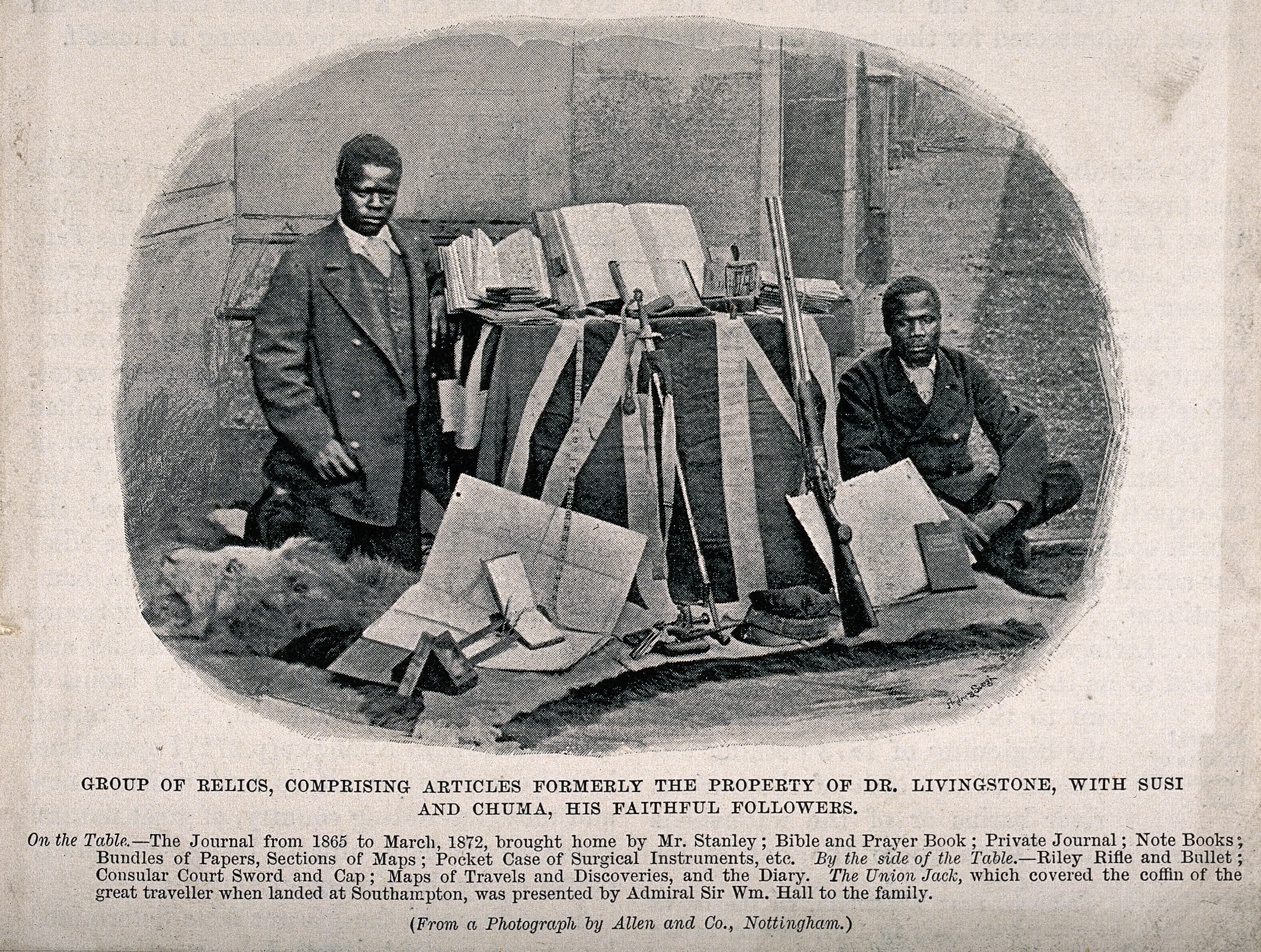
James Chuma and Abdullah Susi, in European attire, at Newstead Abbey with Livingstone's journals and equipment.

On their way north to stay with Young at his Kelly Estate, they visited Newstead Abbey, the home of Livingstone's friend William Frederick Webb and began work with Waller going over manuscripts to edit Livingstone's Last Journal for publication. Webb's daughter Augusta Fraser long recalled them being ushered in wearing thick blue serge reefer jackets, with bright round buttons, and blue serge trousers: they were "immensely proud" of these new clothes, but "evidently found them rather irksome". She felt they "were on the best of terms. Although Susi was evidently the responsible superior, Chumah surpassed him in quickness of perception." Their modest readiness to answer questions "pleased every one, upstairs and downstairs alike", when they dined with the servants the maids were impressed by their good manners.

Waller took them on trips, they saw an agricultural show, and on 19 June they visited a workhouse. Both Chuma and Susi were presented with a Royal Geographical Society medal on 22 June.

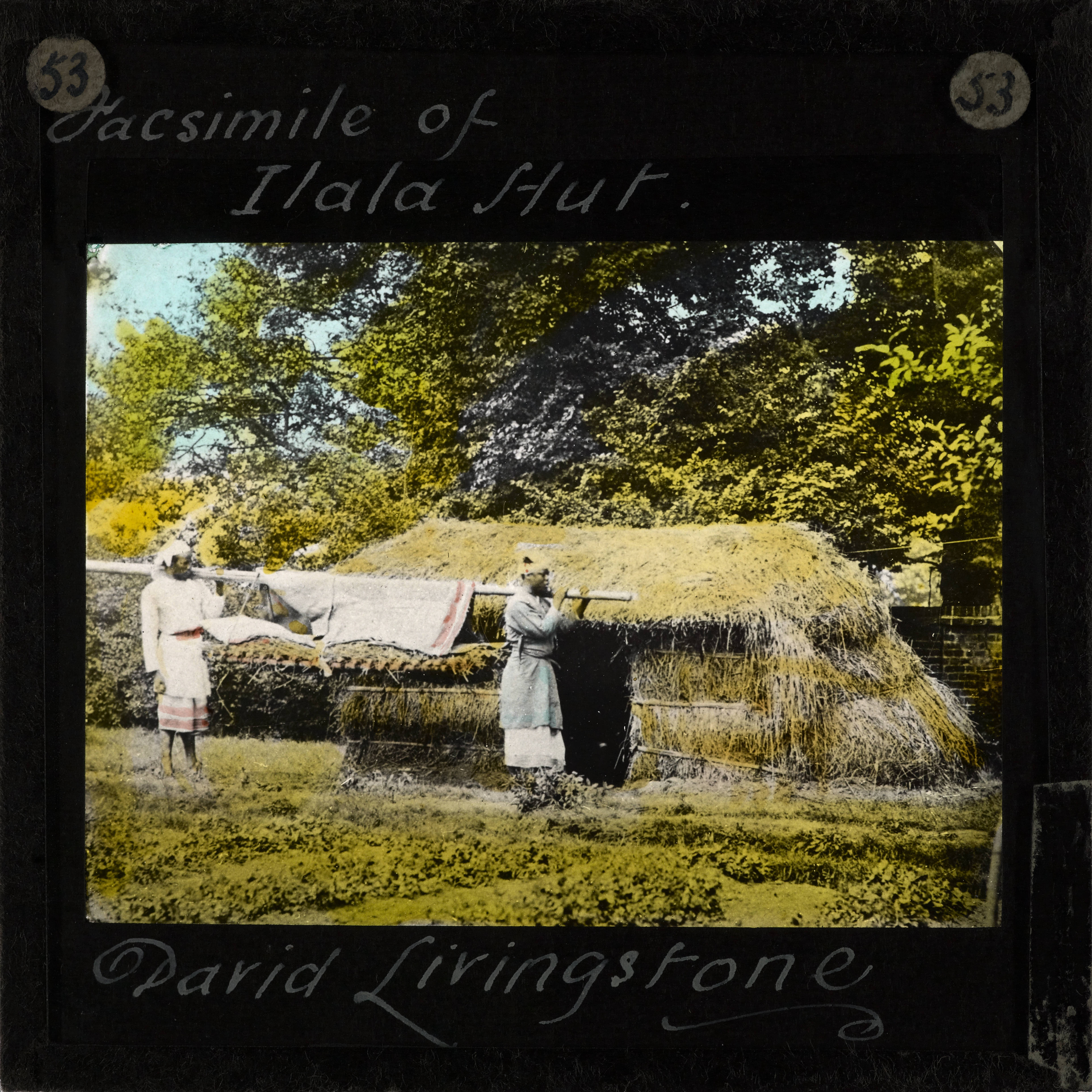
Replica of kitanda and Livingstone's Hut, lantern slide.

In July, they made their "long-planned visit" to Young's home at Kelly, Wemyss Bay. Young questioned them closely, with particular interest in the hut in which Livingstone had died, and as grass in fields was similar to that in Africa, they made a facsimile of the one they had built at Ilala. A photo of this informed the book illustrator. They also replicated the kitanda they had made to carry Livingstone after he became too weak to walk.

In September, they visited Livingstone's relatives at Hamilton and made another replica hut. Anna Mary Livingstone, his youngest daughter, wrote to her friend Hans Christian Andersen "Papa's two coloured servants were here seeing us last week. They were telling us a great many interesting things about Papa, and one of them called Chumah made a little model of the grass hut in which Papa died and showed us the position of Papa's bed in it. It is very interesting to us."

In his editorial preface to The Last Journal, Waller credits Young with making Chuma and Susi available "so long as I required them to help me amidst the pile of MSS. and maps. Their knowledge of the countries they travelled in is most remarkable, and from constantly aiding their master by putting questions to the natives respecting the course of rivers, &c., I found them actual geographers of no mean attainments." Susi had drawn from memory a river system which tallied with Livingstone's own map. Waller had known them from years on the Zambesi and Shire, and "it was a pleasure to have them with me for four months."

They returned to Africa and by 20 October 1874 were in Zanzibar.

== Further expeditions ==
=== Chuma ===
James Chuma married the year after Livingstone's funeral and worked with the Universities' Mission to Central Africa in Zanzibar from 1875 to 1878.

In January 1879 the Royal Geographical Society’s 1878-80 East African Expedition, led by A. Keith Johnston accompanied by Joseph Thomson, arrived at Zanzibar and employed Chuma as chief headman and caravan leader. After visiting the Usambara Mountains they set off from Dar es Salaam on 19 May with 150 in the party. Johnston died on 23 June, but the expedition successfully reached Lake Tanganyika under Thomson, who then went ahead with a small group from 22 November, leaving most of the men in camp under Chuma's command, then rejoined them on 4 April and they reached the coast with no other casualties.

The Royal Geographical Society recognised Chuma's contributions by presenting him with a silver medal and a sword. Chuma worked on an 1880 expedition led by Captain T. L. Phipson-Wybrants, then worked again for Thomson. Chuma died towards the end of 1882 of tuberculosis. Thomson praised Chuma as head-man "having in his own special way, done so much to open up Africa to science and communication."

=== Susi ===
Back in Africa Susi went on to take part in further expeditions including the one led by Stanley in 1879-82. He afterwards served in mission work in the Nyassa country. Originally Muslim, Susi was baptised as a Christian on 23 August 1886 under the name David. He married Mochosi and died 5 May 1891 in Zanzibar.

== Portrayal ==
In his 1959 play Last Journey the South African author Alan Paton depicts the journey to the coast with Livingstone's wrapped corpse, which is centre-stage while the action explores the motivations of his African servants, particularly Susi and Chuma. The context is Paton's opposition to racism and apartheid.
