= Augusta Zelia Fraser =

English writer working in Jamaica

- Born: Augusta Zelia Webb
- Occupations: Novelist and amateur ethnographer
- Spouse: Philip Affleck Fraser (m. 1889)
- Relatives: William Frederick Webb (father)
- Writing career
- Years active: 1890s–1910s
- Period: Victorian era
- Notable works: A Study in Colour (1894); Lucilla: An Experiment (1895) (vol. 1; vol. 2); Livingstone and Newstead (1913)

Augusta Zelia Fraser (1857/8 – 11 December 1925), born Augusta Zelia Webb, generally publishing pseudonymously as Alice Spinner, was an English-born writer of fiction and amateur ethnography who produced much of her work while living in Jamaica in the late 19th century. She published two novels, one memoir, and a number of short stories.

== Life ==
=== Early life ===
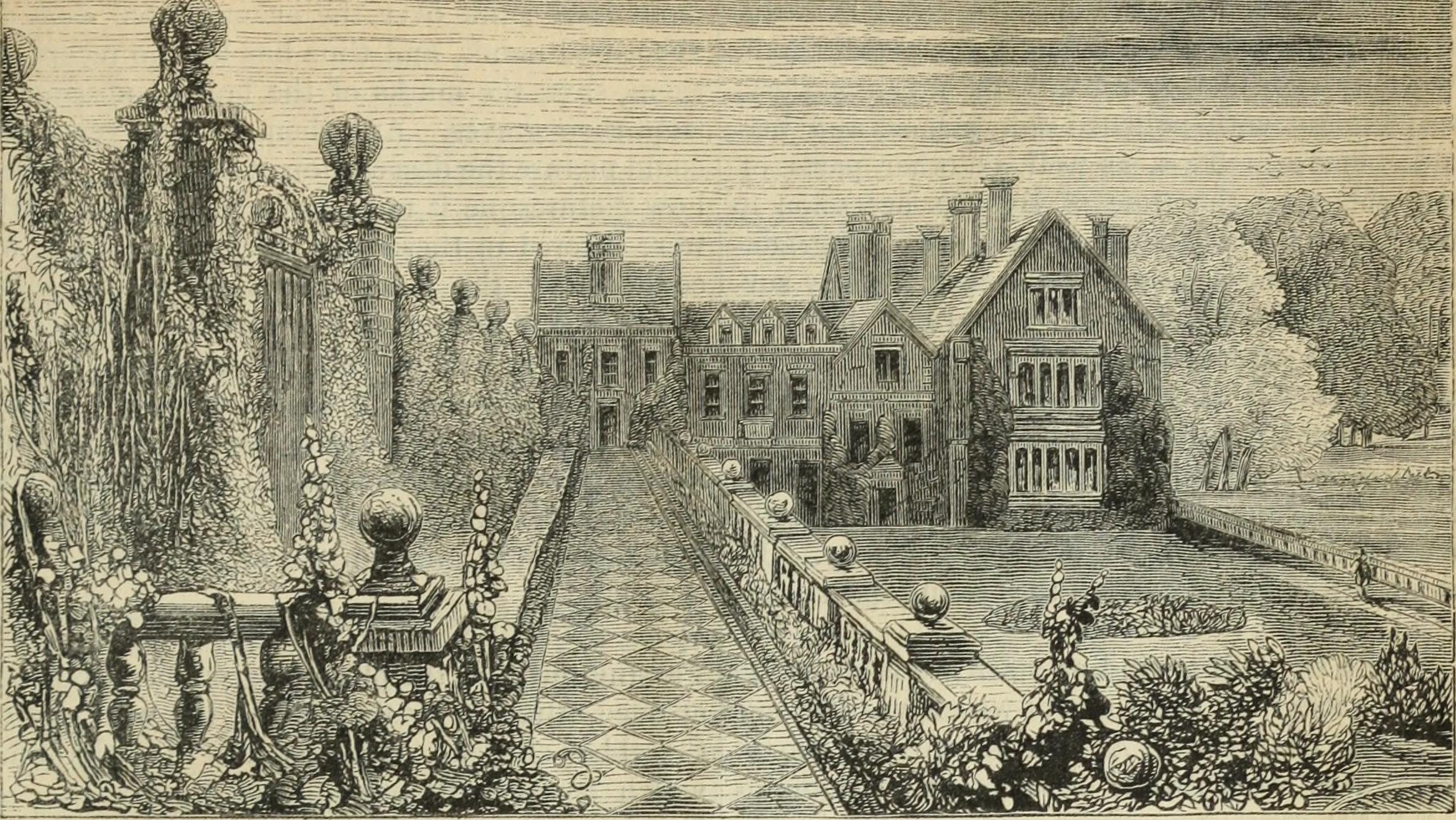
Engraving of Newstead Abbey, 1860.

Augusta Zelia Webb was born in 1857 or 1858, the eldest daughter of a wealthy family of minor gentry. The family's principal seat, which Augusta's father purchased in 1861 from the family of Thomas Wildman, was Newstead Abbey in Nottinghamshire. Augusta spent her childhood there, and she was educated at home. She had five siblings: Geraldine Katherine, Ethel Mary, Mabel Cecilia, Algernon Frederick (born 13 May 1865), and Roderick Beauclerk (born 3 March 1867).

Augusta's mother, Emilia Jane Webb (née Goodlake), was the granddaughter of Sir Edward Baker Baker, 1st Baronet, and the daughter of Emilia Maria Baker and Thomas Mills Goodlake of Wadley House, Littleworth, Oxfordshire.

Emilia Jane and Augusta's father, William Frederick Webb JP DL, were married on 15 July 1857. William, styled lord of the manor of South Cowton, Yorkshire (although he was not a lord) was the eldest son of Frederick Webb of Westwick, County Durham. William was an officer in the 17th Lancers for a time, but later left to explore South Africa, where he hunted big game and grew acquainted with David Livingstone. Augusta would later write a memoir, Livingstone and Newstead (1913), about Livingstone's extended stay at Newstead following his return from the Zambezi expedition in July 1864.

Augusta's wealth increased further upon her father's death on 24 February 1899 (in Luxor, on one of his adventures in the antipodes). William's estate was valued at just over £165,538 (equivalent to £23,010,000 in 2024). Of that fortune, Fraser received £3,000 (equivalent to £417,000 in 2024) in her father's will, on trust; and a £600 (equivalent to £83,000 in 2024) annuity from the revenues of Newstead and William's other lands. Newstead was not devised to Fraser, presumably because her husband Philip held lands at Reelig, in Inverness-shire.

Augusta married Philip Affleck Fraser on 7 August 1889 at St Peter's Church, Eaton Square. The couple were evidently rather well known in the genteel world, as they received presents from aristocrats including William Beauclerk, Duke of St Albans; Sydney Pierrepont, Viscount Newark; Victor Child Villiers, Earl of Jersey; and Alan Cathcart, Earl Cathcart, among others.

Philip Affleck Fraser (b. 1845) of the Clan Fraser of Lovat, was the hereditary owner of Reelig, a tract in Kirkhill, Inverness-shire. As a result of the marriage, Fraser's Scottish estates came under combined control with the Webb family's lands in Nottinghamshire. Augusta's son, Charles Ian Fraser (born 6 April 1903)), would inherit Newstead and Cowton through his mother and Reelig through his father.

=== Jamaica and after ===
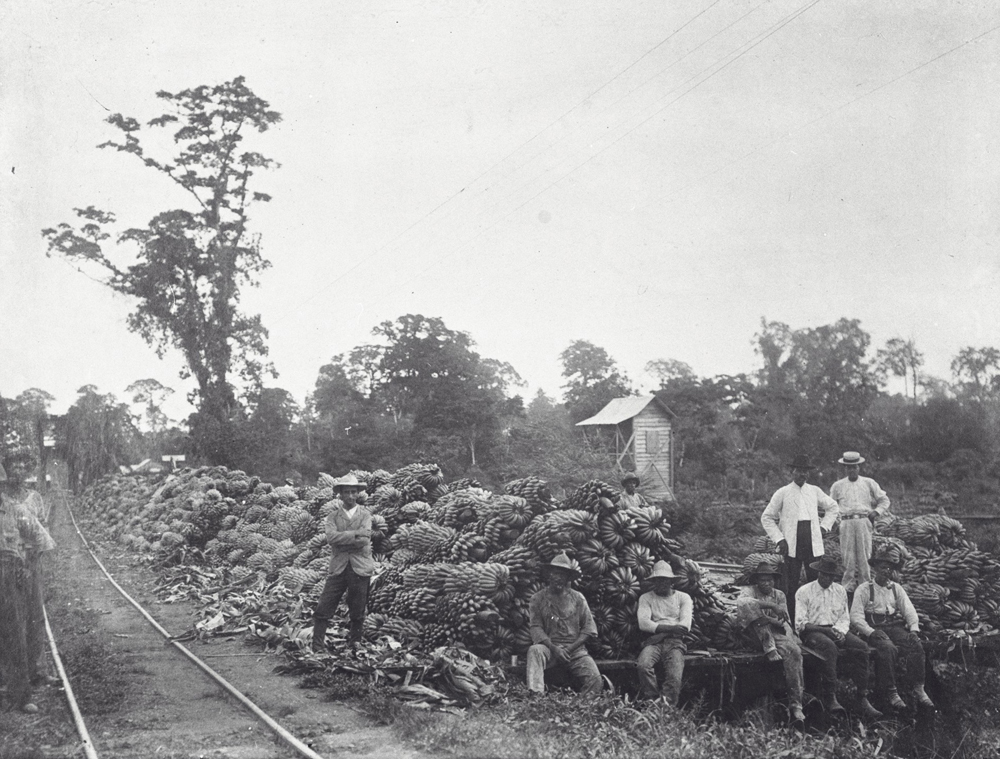
Preparing bananas for rail transport, c. 1890–1920.

Philip, a Fellow of the Royal Geographical Society and a Member of the Institution of Civil Engineers, was an engineer who had worked on railways in a number of countries. In 1892, three years after they were married, Augusta left with Philip for Jamaica—then still a colony of the British Empire—where he was to supervise the construction of a rail project as surveyor-general and inspector.

It is not surprising that a rail engineer should have been sought after in Jamaica in the late 19th century. New railway construction, which had been vetoed by the colonial governor a few years before, began again in 1889 with the sale of the country's railway corporation to the West India Improvement Company. Hopes were high that railway development would kick-start the struggling economy, then reeling from a shock due to a substantial decline in the price of sugar. West India Improvement would construct two new lines over the course of the 1890s. An 1893 court case, which went all the way to the Privy Council, reveals that among Philip's responsibilities at the railway was to scout land for new construction—presumably, then, he would have travelled widely throughout the island.

Fraser moved back to the United Kingdom at some point before 1914. As of 1914, she was living at her husband's estate in Kirkhill. As of her death in 1925, she once again resided at Newstead Abbey.

== Writing ==
Fraser published two novels, A Study in Colour (1894) and Lucilla: An Experiment (1895); one collection of short stories, A Reluctant Evangelist and Other Stories (1896); and one memoir, Livingstone and Newstead (1913), about David Livingstone's stay at her family seat while she was young. Most of her corpus concerns life in Jamaica—often lightly fictionalised—and the fraught racial dynamics of the period.

=== Historical background ===
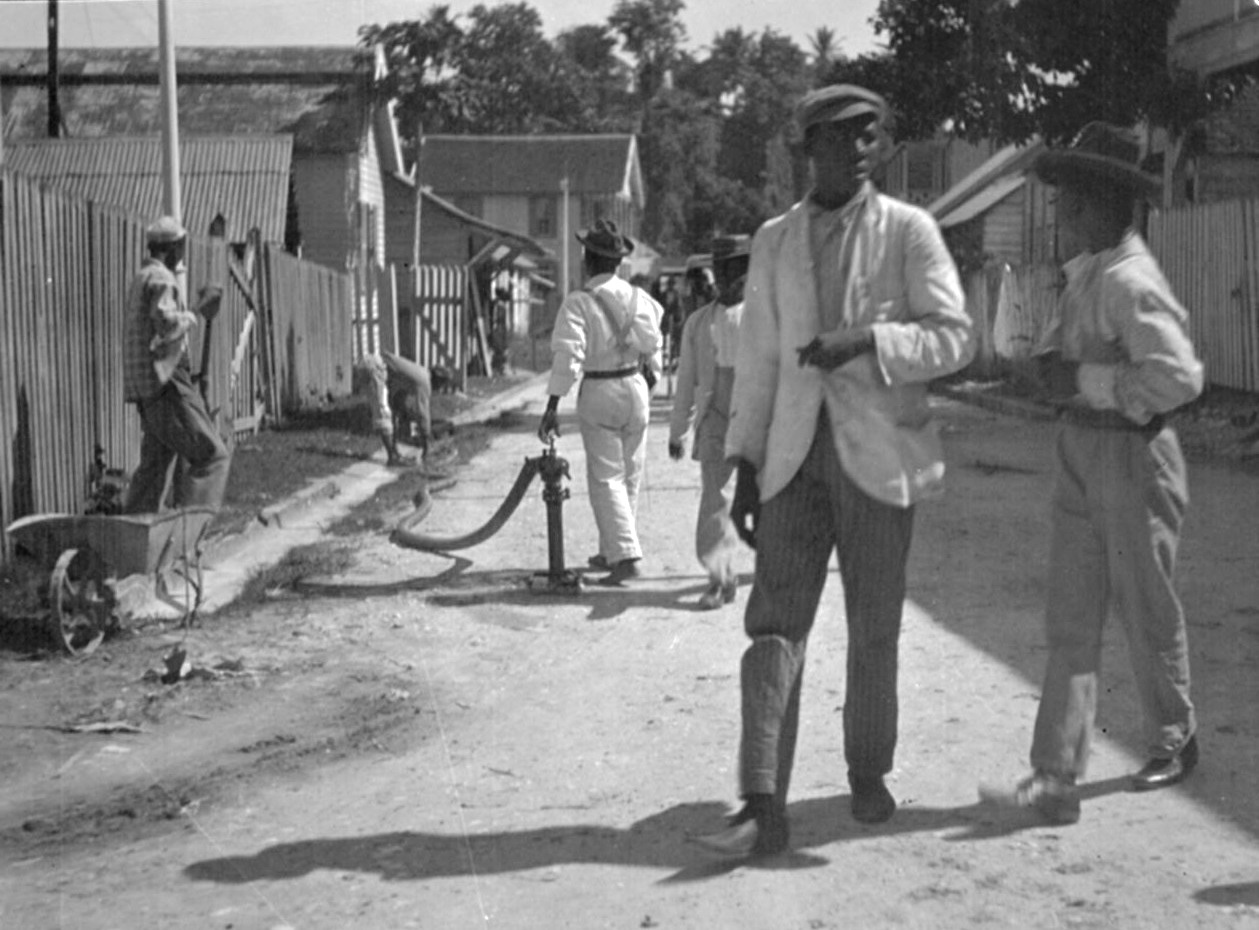
Street scene, Port Antonio, 1899.

Jamaica in the 19th century was marked by crisis. The Imperial Parliament had ended slavery by the Slavery Abolition Act 1833, but abolition did not result in equality. Rather, on 1 August 1834, slaves became so-called 'apprentices', with full legal emancipation to come six years later, on 1 August 1840 (later amended to 1 August 1838). Traditional practices such as obeah had long been criminalised.

'By the 1840s', Hall explains, 'the island was increasingly identified as a problem' by the imperial metropole, as a result of the labour strife that followed emancipation. A prevailing view in London was that the 'experiment' of abolition had 'failed'.

The Morant Bay rebellion of 1865 brought an end to representative government on the island and the return of direct rule by colonial governors: Jamaica was once more a Crown colony. Reforms in the 1870s reintroduced some representative elements, including election of some members of the legislature by a tightly restricted franchise.

Global sugar prices dropped in the 1890s, shocking Jamaica's export-driven economy. Nonetheless, British promoters were advertising island vacations to Jamaica in the late 19th century. Evidently, the view from the metropolis was not all bad.

Buckridge explains that Jamaica, following emancipation, was divided into three racialised classes: the 'white elite', the 'brown population'; and 'Afro-Jamaicans'. The white elite comprised plantation owners and bourgeois professionals. The 'brown' class, which was internally stratified along various lines, viewed itself as a 'separate and distinct group' from others on the island and constituted a burgeoning middle class. 'Afro-Jamaicans', who, Buckridge notes, were 'often viewed through the lens of negative racial stereotyping carried over from slavery', typically experienced the most limited social opportunities.

The Jamaica Fraser chronicled, then, was suffering economically and riven by racial divides carried over from slavery, which had ended formally just over 50 years before she arrived. Her writing accordingly attends closely to racial dynamics.

=== Critical background ===
Fraser's corpus has not been the subject of extensive study, and there is limited consensus on its proper interpretation among those who have studied her work. One thing scholars do agree on is that Fraser's authorial voice is satirical, sarcastic, or ironic. There is also a general sense among critics that Fraser was racist and viewed white Europeans as superior to Black Jamaicans. Beyond that, critical assessments of Fraser vary.

One view unequivocally casts Fraser as a racist mouthpiece for empire. Rosenberg argues that Fraser both 'exploited' her servants for literary material and 'assert[ed] her own superiority through imperialist conceptions of race, gender, and class'. Gohrisch concurs, arguing that Fraser's work is 'ingrained with the views of a British upper-middle-class woman looking down at both racially and socially inferior colonial 'Others'.' Johnson agrees, describing Fraser's A Study in Colour (1894) as 'mainly about the admiration which darker-skinned persons have for lighter-skinned ones'.

Bryan, by contrast, views Fraser as both an advocate of what he calls 'racial separation'—the distinct, largely isolated development of Black and white societies—and of 'racial determinism': the theory that a person's race is a primary factor in explaining their 'behaviour'. He argues, however, that Fraser does not disparage 'non-Europeans ... as inherently barbaric or savage'. Rather, on Bryan's view, Fraser understands different races as distinct cultures that ought to let each other alone. However, in other work Bryan suggests that some of Fraser's short stories evince a 'supercilious confidence in the superiority of European culture and of "whiteness"'.

=== Lucilla: An Experiment (1895) ===
Fraser's 1895 novel Lucilla: An Experiment has attracted the lion's share of critical attention, both at its publication and in the present day. The two-volume work tells the story of British-born Lucilla St. John's experiences on the fictional island of San José, transparently modelled on Jamaica, where she has come to teach music and French. Lucilla marries Isidore da Costa, a wealthy 'coloured' man, but later regrets her decision, abandons the marriage, and ultimately returns to England.

==== Contemporary criticism ====
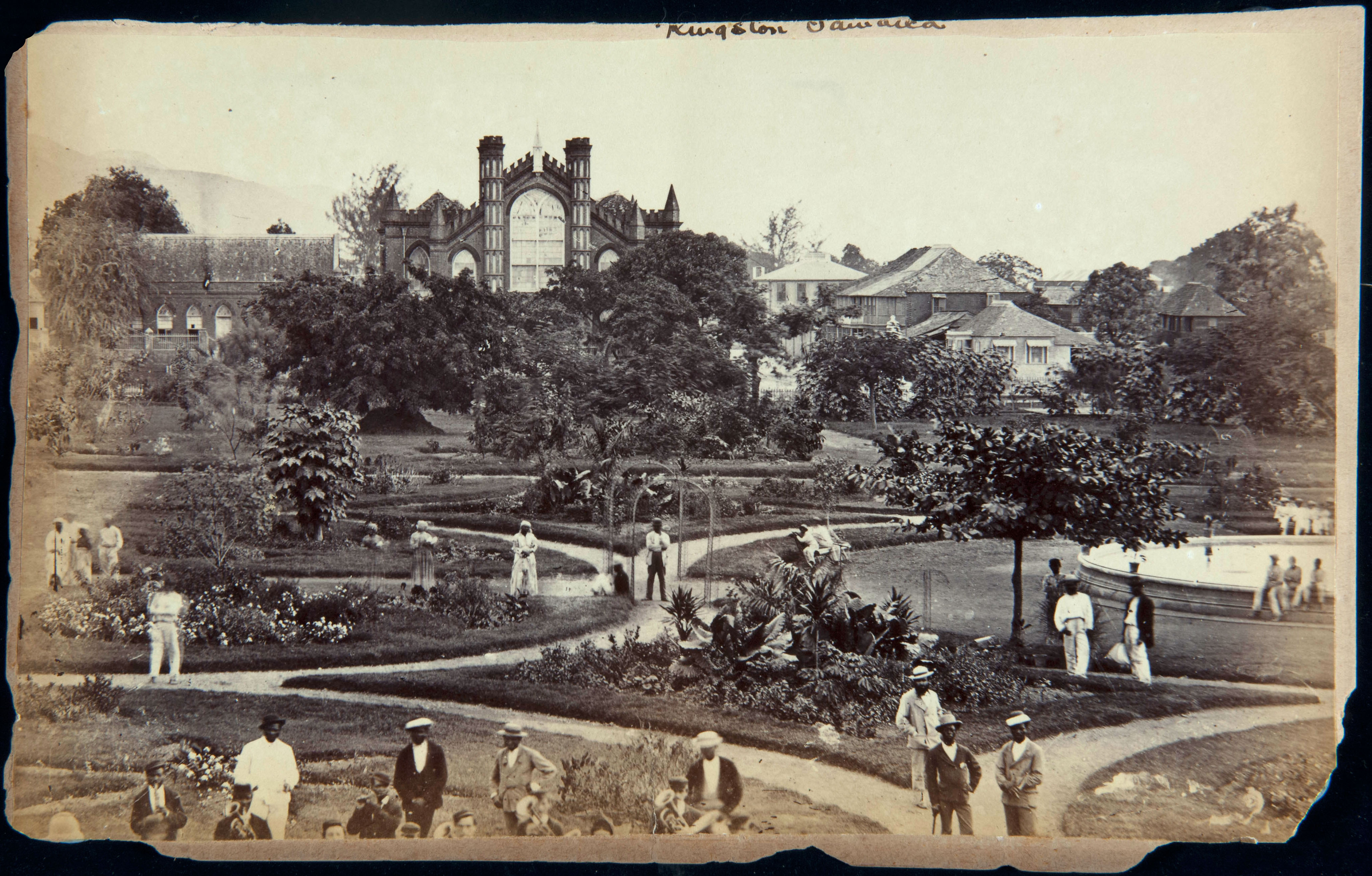
Parade Garden, Kingston, c. 1890.

Contemporary critics of the novel agreed that the title character was neither good nor likeable: The Spectator called her 'narrow-brained, shallow-hearted, indolent, and ill-conditioned'; The Standard, 'not in any sense a nice girl'. They also agreed that the work's titular 'experiment' is Lucilla's marriage to da Costa. The Pall Mall Gazette said that '[t]he experiment poor Lucilla makes is marrying a creole'; the Spectator, that '[t]he great experiment of the book is Lucilla's marriage with an unmistakeable half-caste, Isidore Da Costa, which proves disastrous enough'.

Contemporary criticism of Lucilla focussed on what metropolitan readers regarded as the shocking nature of race relations in the West Indies. A reviewer for The Morning Post, careful to note that Lucilla was not a 'book[] with a purpose', wrote:

More than one clever author has written of life in the West Indies, but this is perhaps the first book treating especially of the state of local feeling regarding marriages contracted between persons of European extraction and those of mixed blood. American novelists tell of the persistent antagonism existing between the races at all points where the freed African has been promoted to the political privileges of the white man. But it is less generally known that emancipation of far older date in the West Indian Islands has scarcely been more successful in bringing about the social amalgamation of the two races.

The Graphic expanded on this general theme, suggesting that Lucilla was indeed a 'novel with a purpose':

… the interest which [the novel] excites is of the sort to make the blood glow and tingle at the possibility of such cruelty of caste as is here described, even if a large margin be allowed for the colouring of a novel with a purpose, and if the picture be no more than half true. … Whether her ideas of reform are practical is another matter; but there is this to be said for them, that they imply no Quixotic hope of immediate amelioration.

==== Present-day criticism ====
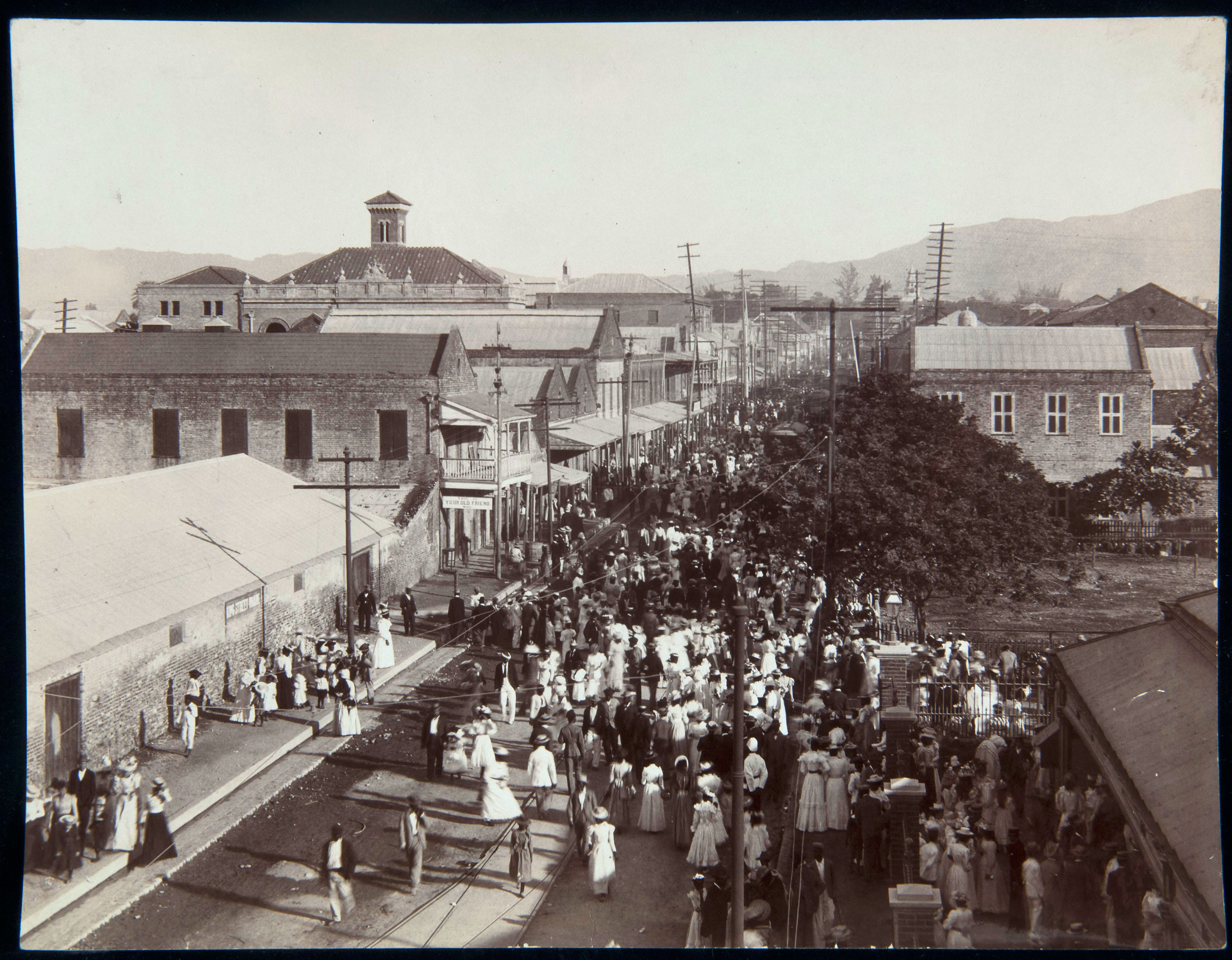
Street scene, Kingston, c. 1900.

Bryan argues that Lucilla adopts a pessimistic attitude toward interracial marriage—and, indeed, toward Jamaican society in general. In Bryan's view, Fraser supports 'separate development of the races' as opposed to intermarriage or other forms of racial integration. He also notes that Fraser's narrator does not regard the white population as homogeneous, but identifies internal divisions between imperial officials and whites who have made Jamaica their permanent home—even as those social strata are unified in their contempt for Black and 'coloured' Jamaicans.

Gohrisch, another present-day critic, describes Lucilla as an example of 'middlebrow fiction'. She largely concurs with Bryan as to Lucilla's arch, satiric assessment of Jamaican society—especially of its Black and 'coloured' members—with one exception. She argues that Lucilla valorises middle-class 'brown' or 'coloured' women. According to Gohrisch, the true hero of Lucilla, epitomised by the characters Liris Morales and Teresa de Souza, is a woman who is 'light brown, cosmopolitan, cultured, determined, single and yet rich enough to do woman’s work without being remunerated.'

== Works ==
- Fraser, Augusta Zelia (August 1894). "Margaret: A Sketch in Black and White". National Review. 23 (138): 847–860 – via Internet Archive.
- Fraser, Augusta Zelia (1894). A Study in Colour. London: T. Fisher Unwin.
- 'A Reluctant Evangelist' (short story, 1894)
  - Original printing: Fraser, Augusta Zelia (November 1894). "A Reluctant Evangelist". National Review. 24 (141): 415–432. ProQuest 6850563.
  - Reprint: Fraser, Augusta Zelia (December 1894). "A Reluctant Evangelist". The Eclectic Magazine of Foreign Literature, Science, and Art. New series. 60 (6): 826–837. hdl:2027/iau.31858055207736.
  - Reprint: Fraser, Augusta Zelia (29 December 1894). "A Reluctant Evangelist". Littell's Living Age. 6th series. 4 (2634): 776–788. hdl:2027/chi.55227124.
- Fraser, Augusta Zelia (1895). Lucilla: An Experiment. 2 vols. London: Kegan Paul, Trench, Trübner. OCLC 35923457.
  - Volume 1
  - Volume 2
- Fraser, Augusta Zelia (June 1895). "Concerning Duppies". National Review. 25 (148): 552–563 – via Google Books.
- Fraser, Augusta Zelia (1896). A Reluctant Evangelist and Other Stories. London: Edward Arnold. OCLC 267024325.
- Fraser, Augusta Zelia (April 1896). "The Principles of Miss Mehitabel". The Cornhill Magazine. New series. 24: 379–404.
- Fraser, Augusta Zelia (December 1896). "Pete, the Fool". Queen.
- Fraser, Augusta Zelia (1898). "Allie's Pulpit". Chapman.
- Fraser, Augusta Zelia (February 1907). "The Man with the Matches". The Cornhill Magazine. 3rd series. 22.
- Fraser, Augusta Zelia (1913). Livingstone and Newstead. London: John Murray.

== Sources ==
- "FRASER, Mrs. Augusta Zelia (Alice Spinner)". Who's Who. London: A & C Black. 1914. p. 746.
- Bryan, Patrick (2002). "Augusta Zelia Fraser in Jamaica: The Case for Racial Separation". Caribbean Quarterly. 48 (4): 12–26. doi:10.1080/00086495.2002.11672157. ISSN 0008-6495. JSTOR 40654293. S2CID 161414023.
- Buckridge, Steeve O. (2018), "'Black Skin, White Mask?': Race, Class, and the Politics of Dress in Victorian Jamaican Society, 1837–1901", in Barringer, Tim; Modest, Wayne (eds.), Victorian Jamaica, Duke University Press, pp. 577–601, doi:10.1215/9780822374626-020, ISBN 978-0-8223-7462-6
- Coope, Rosalys (2001). "An Intriguing Patronage?". Architectural History. 44: 351–357. doi:10.2307/1568764. JSTOR 1568764. S2CID 195001378.
- Gohrisch, Jana (2020). "Imagining the British West Indies in Middlebrow Fiction". In Gohrisch, Jana; Ehland, Christoph (eds.). Imperial Middlebrow. Leiden: Brill. pp. 103–123. doi:10.1163/9789004426566_007. ISBN 9789004426559. OCLC 1139887336. S2CID 225915177.
- Hall, Catherine (2018), "Rewriting the Past: Imperial Histories of the Antislavery Nation", in Barringer, Tim; Modest, Wayne (eds.), Victorian Jamaica, Durham, North Carolina: Duke University Press, pp. 263–277, doi:10.1215/9780822374626-009, ISBN 978-0-8223-7462-6
- Heuman, Gad (2018), "Victorian Jamaica: The View from the Colonial Office", in Barringer, Tim; Modest, Wayne (eds.), Victorian Jamaica, Durham, North Carolina: Duke University Press, pp. 139–155, doi:10.1215/9780822374626-003, ISBN 978-0-8223-7462-6
- Morgan, Kenneth (September 2012). "Labour Relations during and after Apprenticeship: Amity Hall, Jamaica, 1834–1840". Slavery & Abolition. 33 (3): 457–478. doi:10.1080/0144039X.2011.606629. ISSN 0144-039X. S2CID 144937768.
- Rosenberg, Leah Reade (30 April 2016). Nationalism and the Formation of Caribbean Literature. London: Palgrave Macmillan. ISBN 978-1-137-09922-8.
