= Newstead Abbey =

English country house and former monastery

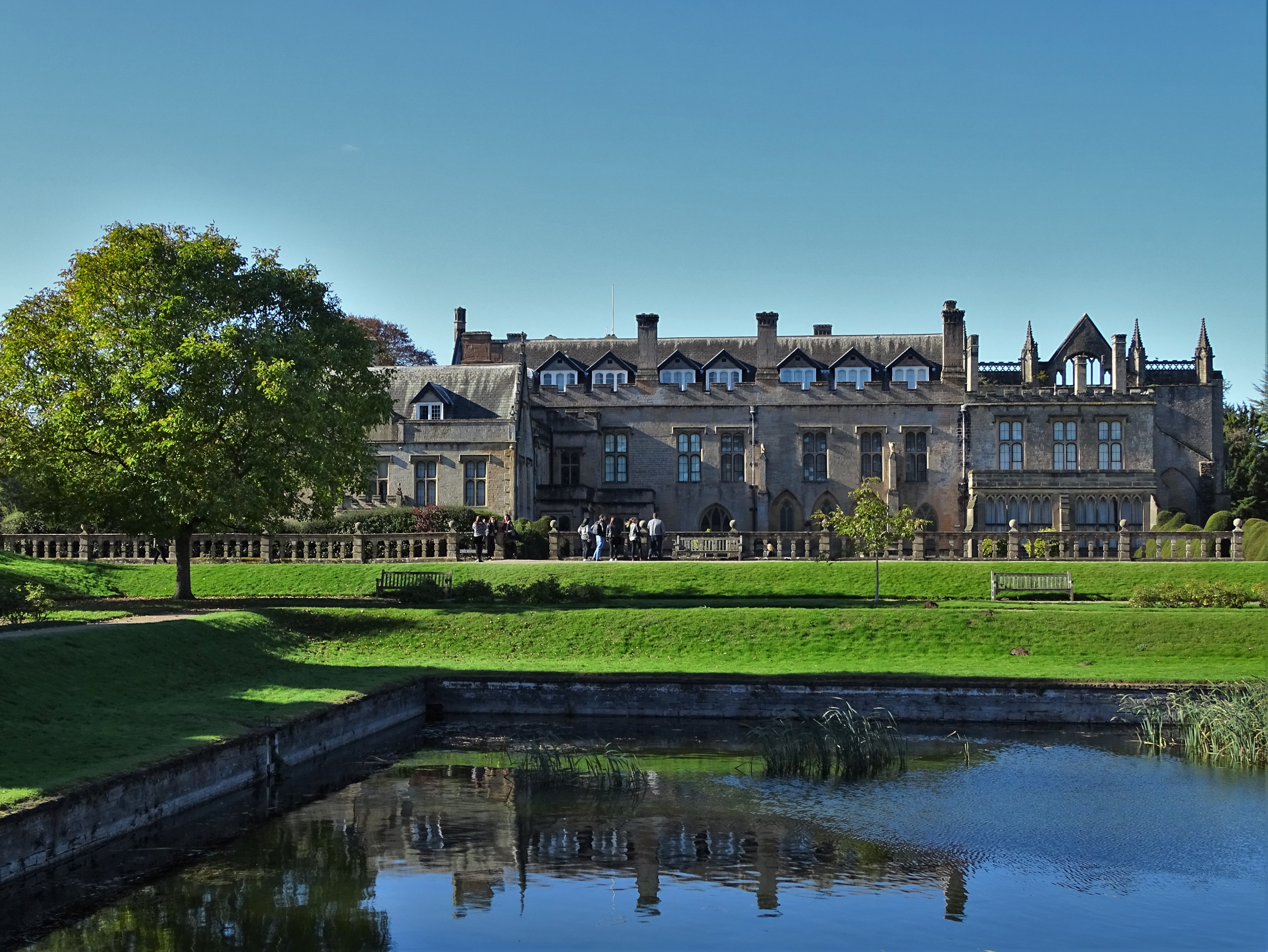
- A view of the Abbey from its east side

- Location within Nottinghamshire

General information
- Location: Ravenshead, Nottinghamshire, NG15 9HJ
- Coordinates: 53.078333°N 1.1925°W
- Construction started: ca 1170
- Owner: Nottingham City Council

Website
- Newstead Abbey

Listed Building – Grade I
- Official name: Newstead Abbey
- Designated: 14 May 1952
- Reference no.: 1265325

National Register of Historic Parks and Gardens
- Designated: 1 January 1986
- Reference no.: 1001082

Newstead Abbey, in Ravenshead, Nottinghamshire, England, was formerly an Augustinian priory. Converted to a domestic home following the dissolution of the monasteries, it is now best known as the ancestral home of Lord Byron. The Abbey is on the national Heritage at Risk Register.

== As a monastery ==
The priory of St. Mary of Newstead, a house of Augustinian Canons, was founded by King Henry II of England about the year 1170, as one of many penances he paid following the murder of Thomas Becket. Contrary to its current name, Newstead was never an abbey: it was a priory.

In the late 13th century, the priory was rebuilt and extended. It was extended again in the 15th century, when the Dorter, Great Hall and Prior's Lodgings were added. The priory was designed to be home to at least 13 monks, although there appear to have been only 12 (including the Prior) at the time of the dissolution.

The Valor Ecclesiasticus of 1534 gave the clear annual value of this priory as £167 16s. 11½d. The considerable deductions included 20s. given to the poor on Maundy Thursday in commemoration of Henry II, the founder, and a portion of food and drink similar to that of a canon given to some poor person every day, valued at 60s. a year.

Despite the annual value of Newstead being clearly below the £200 assigned as the limit for the suppression of the lesser monasteries, this priory obtained the doubtful privilege of exemption, on payment to the Crown of the heavy fine of £233 6s. 8d in 1537.

The surrender of the house was accomplished on 21 July 1539. The signatures attached were those of John Blake, prior, Richard Kychun, sub-prior, and John Bredon, cellarer, and nine other canons, Robert Sisson, John Derfelde, William Dotton, William Bathley, Christopher Motheram, Geoffrey Acryth, Richard Hardwyke, Henry Tingker, and Leonard Alynson.

The prior obtained a pension of £26 13s. 4d., the sub-prior £6, and the rest of the ten canons who signed the surrender received sums varying from £5 6s. 8d. to £3 6s. 8d.

The lake was dredged in the late eighteenth century and the lectern, thrown into the Abbey fishpond by the monks to save it during the dissolution of the monasteries, was discovered. In 1805 it was given by Archdeacon Kaye to Southwell Minster where it still resides.

=== Priors of Newstead ===
- Eustace, 1216
- Richard, 1216
- Robert, 1234
- William (late cellarer), 1241
- William, 1267
- John de Lexinton, resigned 1288
- Richard de Hallam, 1288
- Richard de Grange, 1293
- William de Thurgarton, 1324
- Hugh de Colingham, 1349
- William de Colingham, resigned 1356
- John de Wylesthorp, resigned 1366
- William de Allerton, 1366
- John de Hucknall, 1406
- William Bakewell, 1417
- Thomas Carleton, resigned 1424
- Robert Cutwolfe, resigned 1424
- William Misterton, 1455
- John Durham, 1461
- Thomas Gunthorp, 1467
- William Sandale, 1504
- John Blake, 1526

== As a country house ==
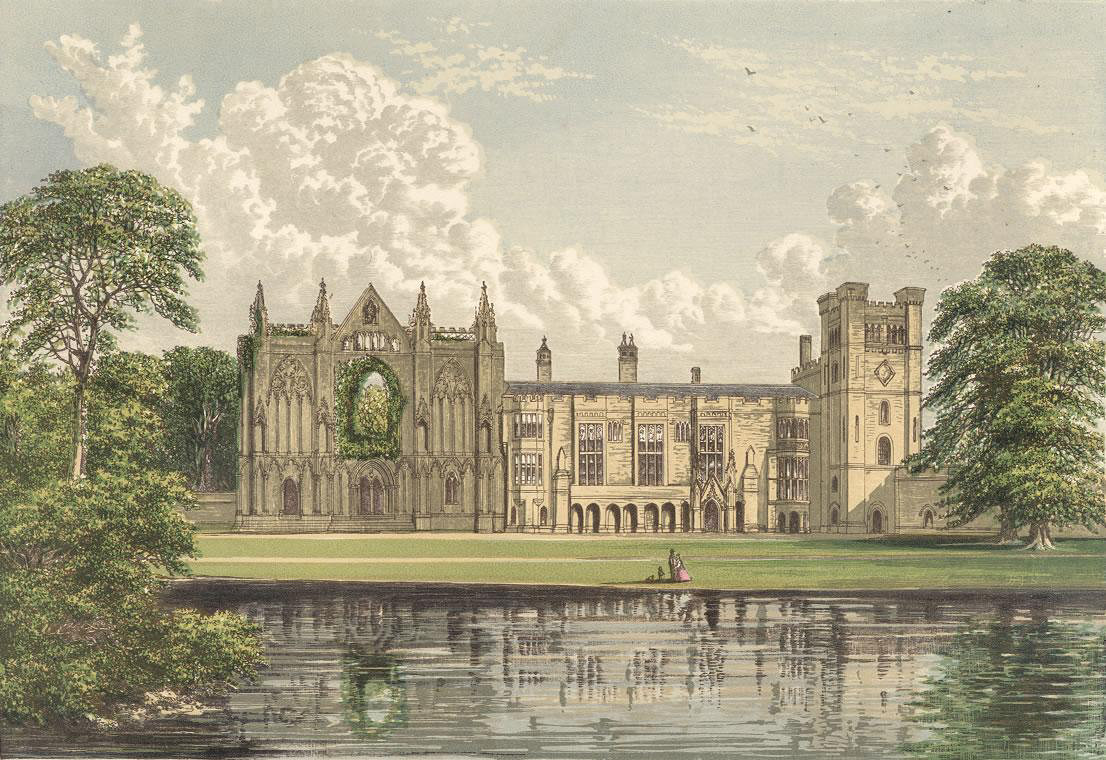
Newstead Abbey in 1880.

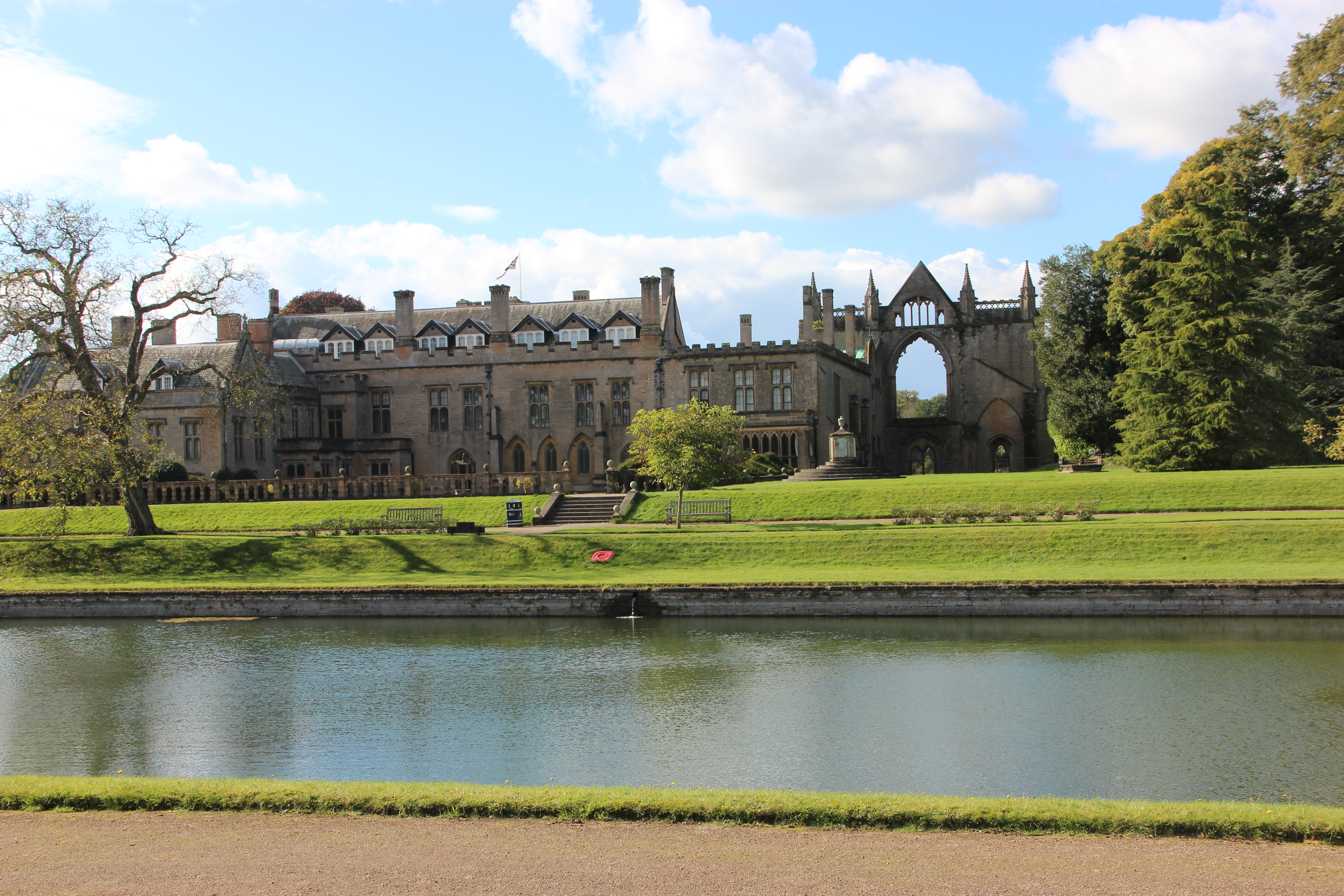
Newstead Abbey in 2012

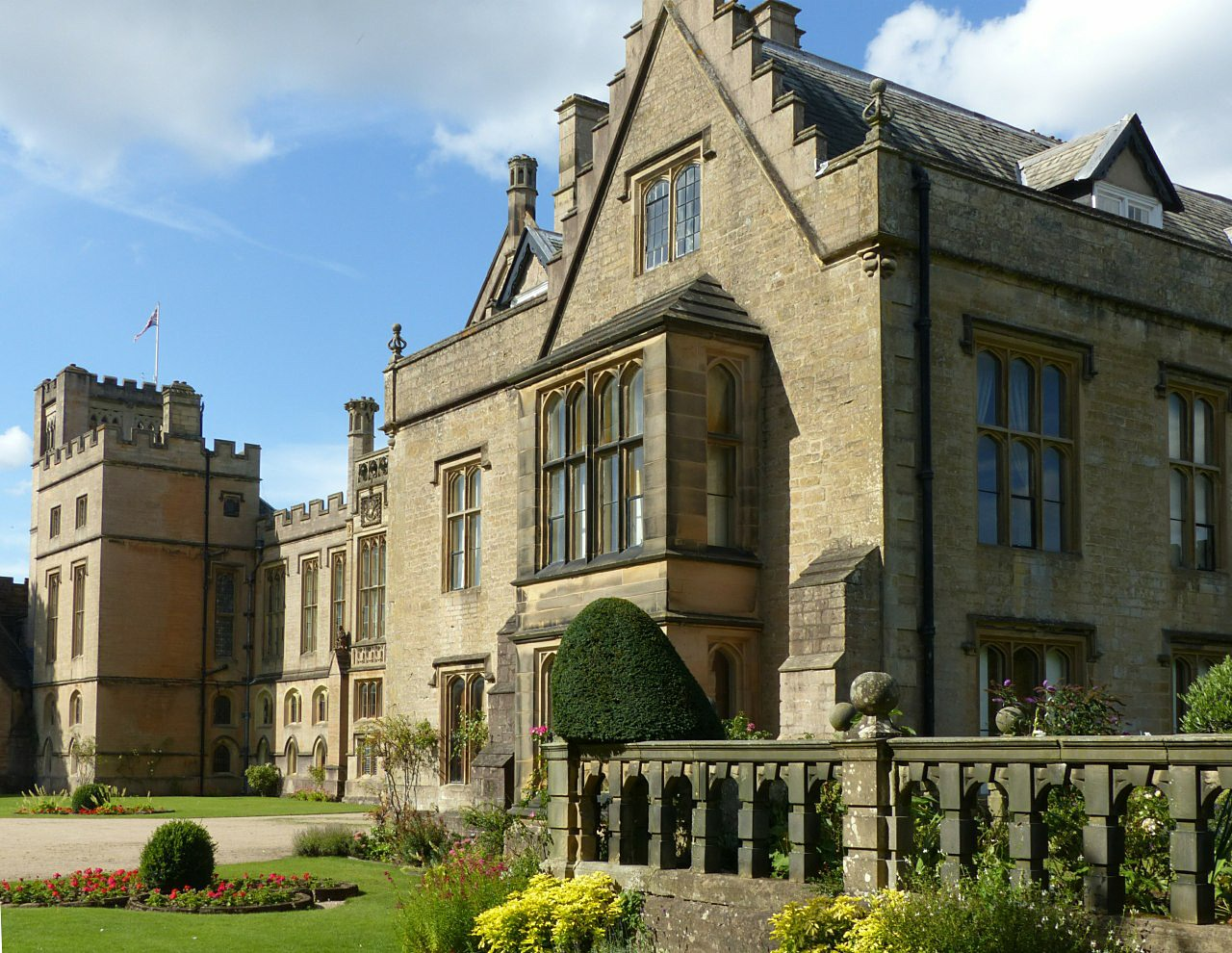
Newstead Abbey in 2019

=== 1540–1798 ===
Sir John Byron of Colwick in Nottinghamshire was granted Newstead Abbey by Henry VIII of England on 26 May 1540 and started its conversion into a country house. He was succeeded by his son Sir John Byron of Clayton Hall. Many additions were made to the original building. The 13th century ecclesiastical buildings were largely ruined during the dissolution of the monasteries. It then passed to John Byron, an MP and Royalist commander, who was created a baron in 1643. He died childless in France and ownership transferred to his brother Richard Byron. Richard's son William was a minor poet and was succeeded in 1695 by his son William Byron, 4th Baron Byron. Early in the 18th century, the 4th Lord Byron landscaped the gardens extensively, and amassed a hugely admired collection of artistic masterpieces.

During the ownership of William, 5th Baron Byron, the Abbey suffered a downturn in fortunes. As a young man, William lavished money on the estate, building picturesque Gothic follies and staging glamorous mock navy battles on the lake. Continuing to take out loans and pursue his pleasures of horse-racing, gambling, and going to the theatre, he found himself financially reliant on a scheme of marrying off his only surviving son and heir to a wealthy heiress. The plan fell apart when his heir eloped with his first cousin, Juliana Byron, daughter of William's brother John Byron.

Though late 18th-century gossip attested that he ruined the estate, felled trees, and killed deer while hellbent on revenge, this is not the case – he simply had no money to pay his debts, and stripped the Abbey and estate of its artistic treasures, furniture, and even its trees, to quickly raise cash. Though he made thousands of pounds, it was not enough to pay back the loans he had been taking out since his thirties, and there was no hope of restoring the Abbey to its former glory.

As well as outliving all four of his children, William also outlived his only grandson, who was killed by cannon fire in 1794 while fighting in Corsica at the age of 22. The 5th Lord died on 21 May 1798, at the age of 75. Later, 19th-century myths attest that on his death, the great numbers of crickets he kept at Newstead left the estate in swarms. The title and Newstead Abbey were then left to his great-nephew, George Gordon Byron, then aged 10, who became the 6th Baron Byron and later the famous and notorious poet.

=== Ownership by Lord Byron ===
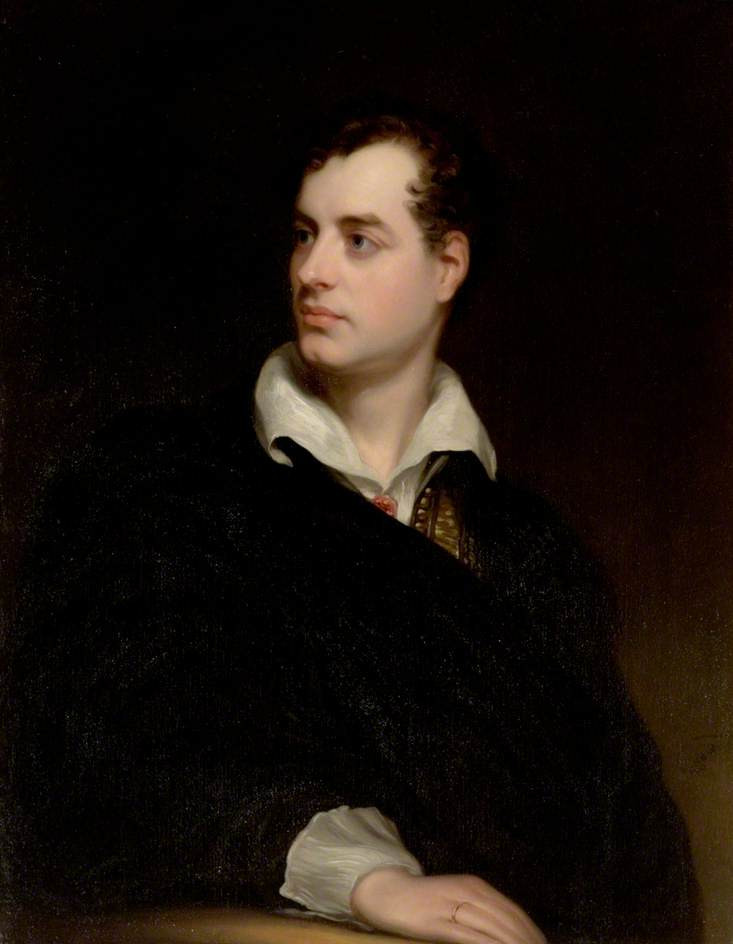
Portrait of Lord Byron by Thomas Phillips, c.1814,

The young Lord Byron soon arrived at Newstead and was greatly impressed by the estate. The scale of the estate contributed to Byron's extravagant taste and sense of his own importance. However, yearly income had fallen to just £800 and many repairs were needed. He and his mother soon moved to the nearby town of Southwell and neither lived permanently at Newstead for any extended period. His view of the decayed Newstead became one of the romantic ruin, a metaphor for his family's fall:

Thro' thy battlements, Newstead, the hollow winds whistle;
Thou, the hall of my fathers, art gone to decay.

The estate was leased to the 23-year-old 19th Baron Grey de Ruthyn, from January 1803. The lease was for £50 a year for the Abbey and Park for five years, until Byron came of age. Byron stayed for some time in 1803 with Lord Grey de Ruthyn, before they fell out badly.

In 1808, Lord Grey de Ruthyn left at the end of his lease and Byron returned to live at Newstead and began extensive and expensive renovations. His works were mainly decorative, however, rather than structural, so that rain and damp obscured his changes within just a few years.

Byron had a beloved Newfoundland dog named Boatswain, who died of rabies in 1808. Boatswain was buried at Newstead Abbey and has a monument larger than his master's. The upper inscription, from Byron's poem Epitaph to a Dog, has become one of his best-known works, despite in actuality being written by Byron's friend, John Hobhouse:

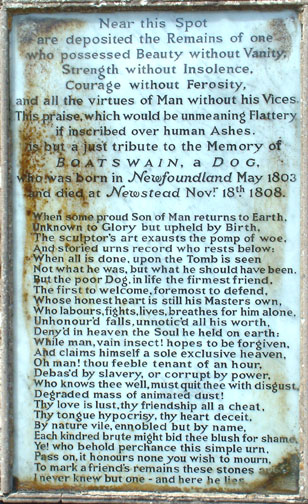
The poem Epitaph to a Dog as inscribed on Boatswain's monument

Near this Spot
Are deposited the Remains
of one
Who possessed Beauty
Without Vanity,
Strength without Insolence,
Courage without Ferosity,
And all the Virtues of Man
without his Vices.
This Praise, which would be unmeaning flattery
If inscribed over Human Ashes,
Is but a just tribute to the Memory of
"Boatswain," a Dog
Who was born at Newfoundland,
May, 1803,
And died at Newstead Abbey
Nov. 18, 1808.

Byron had wanted to be buried with Boatswain, although he would ultimately be buried in the family vault at the nearby Church of St Mary Magdalene, Hucknall.

He was determined to stay at Newstead—"Newstead and I stand or fall together"—and he hoped to raise a mortgage on the property, but his advisor John Hanson urged a sale. This would be a preoccupation for many years and was certainly not resolved when Byron left for his Mediterranean travels in 1809. Upon his return to England in 1811, Byron stayed in London, not returning to see his mother who had been living in Newstead. She died, leaving him distraught at his own negligence of her. He lived again at the Abbey for a time but was soon drawn to life in London.

For the next few years, Byron made several attempts to sell the Abbey. It was put up at auction in 1812 but failed to reach a satisfactory price. A buyer was found, however, who offered £140,000, which was accepted. By spring 1813, though, the buyer, Thomas Claughton, had only paid £5,000 of the agreed down-payment. Byron was in debt and had continued to spend money on the expectation that the house would be sold. Negotiations began to degenerate and Byron accused Claughton of robbing the wine cellar. By August 1814, it was clear that the sale had fallen through, and Claughton forfeited what he had paid of the deposit. Byron was now without settled financial means and proposed marriage to the heiress Anne Isabella Milbanke. Claughton did return with new proposals involving a reduced price and further delays. Byron turned him down.

Letitia Elizabeth Landon's poetical illustration Lines Suggested on Visiting Newstead Abbey accompanies an engraving of Newstead Abbey after a painting by Thomas Allom (Fisher's Drawing Room Scrap Book, 1839). This poem is mainly a reflection on Byron and what it means to be a poet. Miss Landon may have visited Newstead Abbey on one of her visits to her uncle in Aberford, Yorkshire.

=== Later owners ===
==== Colonel Thomas Wildman ====
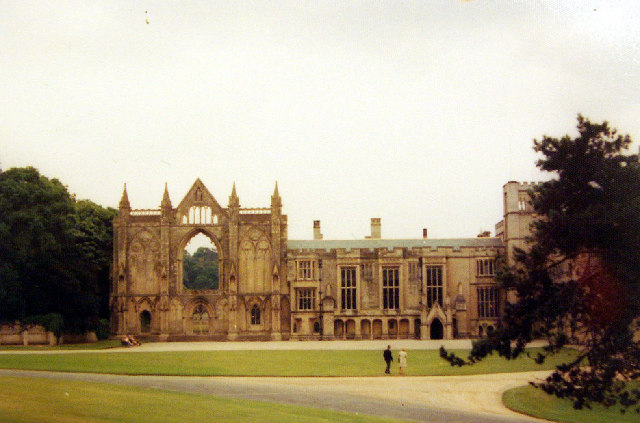
Newstead Abbey (1975)

In July 1815, Newstead was once again put up for auction but failed to reach its reserve, bought in at 95,000 guineas. It was only during Byron's exile in Italy, in 1818, that a buyer was found. Thomas Wildman, who had been at Harrow School with Byron and was heir to Jamaican plantations, paid £94,500, easing Byron's financial troubles considerably.

Wildman too spent a great deal of money on the Abbey and its contents, restoring it to some greatness. The architect John Shaw Sr. designed new parts of the abbey for Wildman.

==== William Frederick Webb ====
In 1861, William Frederick Webb, African explorer, bought the Abbey from Wildman's widow. People including David Livingstone, Abdullah Susi, James Chuma and Jacob Wainwright all visited the Abbey at different times during the period Webb lived there. Under Webb, the chapel was redecorated, but the rest of the house remained largely unaltered. After his death in 1899, the estate passed to each of his surviving children and finally to his grandson Charles Ian Fraser. Fraser sold Newstead to local philanthropist Sir Julien Cahn, who presented it to Nottingham Corporation in 1931.

== As a museum ==
Owned by Nottingham City Council, the Abbey is on the at risk register due to water ingress at the roofs and around the tower. As of January 2025, the council is seeking a £250,000 grant from the National Lottery Heritage Fund for remedial works expected to last until 2028.

The Abbey houses a museum containing Byron memorabilia, and hosts weddings and other events.

Newstead Abbey is open to the public as is the park. There is a cafe and shop, too.

== See also ==
- Grade I listed buildings in Nottinghamshire
- Listed buildings in Newstead, Nottinghamshire
