= Listed buildings in Newstead, Nottinghamshire =

Newstead is a civil parish in the Gedling district of Nottinghamshire, England. The parish contains 23 listed buildings that are recorded in the National Heritage List for England. Of these, one is listed at Grade I, the highest of the three grades, two are at Grade II*, the middle grade, and the others are at Grade II, the lowest grade. The parish contains the village of Newstead, and the surrounding area. The most important building in the parish is Newstead Abbey, which is listed, together with a variety of structures in its gardens and grounds. The other listed buildings consist of a railway bridge, two farmhouses, and a war memorial.

== Key ==
Grade	Criteria
I	Buildings of exceptional interest, sometimes considered to be internationally important
II*	Particularly important buildings of more than special interest
II	Buildings of national importance and special interest

== Buildings ==
Name and location	Photograph	Date	Notes	Grade
Newstead Abbey and walls 53.07838°N 1.19289°W		Late 13th century	Originally an Augustinian priory, it was converted into a country house in 1539, and there have been later alterations and restorations. It is in stone with roofs in tile and slate, and forms a square plan around a cloister, with southeast and southwest wings, and to the north is the retained west gabled end of the priory church. This has three bays, and contains blind arcading, string courses, a moulded balustrade, pinnacles, gargoyles, and gabled buttresses, each with a niche. There is a central doorway flanked by smaller doorways, and above is a window. The house has embattled parapets, and a four-stage tower. To the northwest is an embattled boundary wall with a summerhouse and a gateway, and to the southeast is a balustraded garden wall.	I
Fountain in Cloister Garth; 53.07843°N 1.19265°W		16th century	The fountain is in stone on a chamfered plinth, with a moulded string course, a traceried band and an embattled parapet. It has an octagonal plan and two stages, and is set in a round pool with moulded coping. In the lower stage are scalloped round-headed niches, two with round basins and lion mask spouts. The upper stage has shafts, a lozenge band, and a parapet with crockets and the remains of grotesques.	II
Hazelford Farmhouse; 53.07144°N 1.22440°W	—	Late 17th century	The farmhouse is in stone and brick on a stone plinth and has a pantile roof. There are two storeys, an L-shaped plan, and a front range of three bays. On the front is a gabled porch, and a doorway with a four-centred arch. The windows are casements, most with mullions, and those in the ground floor with hood moulds.	II
Cascade and pool 53.07952°N 1.19125°W		Early 18th century	The cascade and pool are to the north of the garden wall at Newstead Abbey, and are in stone and concrete. The cascade is stepped, and has a ramped coped flanking wall and a mask spout. The pool is oval and about 4 metres (13 ft) wide.	II
Female satyr statue 53.07862°N 1.19016°W		Early 18th century	The statue of a female satyr is in the garden of Newstead Abbey, and is about 2 metres (6 ft 7 in) high. The statue is in lead, and stands on a square stone pedestal with fielded panelled sides, and a moulded base with a cornice.	II
Garden walls, seats and tunnel 53.07850°N 1.18988°W		Early 18th century	The walls enclose the garden to the east of Newstead Abbey, and are in stone. At the northeast corner is a moulded semicircular seat and a balustrade, in the northwest corner is a ramped embattled parapet and obelisk finials, and under the centre of the south wall is a semicircular-headed tunnel with a keystone. Other features include ball finials, and sets of wrought iron gates with square piers with finials.	II
Gardener's cottage and kitchen garden walls 53.07680°N 1.19004°W		Late 18th century	The cottage in the garden of Newstead Abbey is in stone on a chamfered plinth, and has a tile roof with coped gables, kneelers and finials. There are two storeys, a T-shaped plan, and a front range of three bays. The doorway has a Tudor arch, over which is a monogram, and the windows are lancets, all with hood moulds. To the right is a boundary wall containing a doorway. The kitchen garden walls are in brick with stone coping, and form a rectangular plan with a bisecting wall, and contain gateways.	II
Male satyr statue 53.07827°N 1.19028°W		Early 18th century	The statue of a male satyr is in the garden of Newstead Abbey, and is about 2 metres (6 ft 7 in) high. The statue is in lead, and stands on a square stone pedestal with fielded panelled sides, and a moulded base with a cornice.	II
The Cannon Fort and dock 53.07911°N 1.19883°W		1749	A mock fort in stone on a plinth, with a string course, an embattled parapet, nine round bosses on the lake side, and seven arches with pointed recesses at the rear. There is a semicircular central bay flanked by single triangular bastions, and at each end are curved steps. Each bastion has a circular tower with a moulded pointed doorway, and the one to the northeast has a dome with a ball finial.	II*
The Fort, Fort Lodge and Monk's Laundry; 53.07923°N 1.19552°W		c. 1770	A mock fort, later dwellings, in stone on a chamfered plinth, with a moulded string course, an embattled parapet with machicolations and a single coped gable. It is in one and two storeys, with seven bays, and the windows are casements. The entry is flanked by square towers, to the left is a round tower, and there is a round tower on the corner.	II
Boatswain's Monument; 53.07859°N 1.19188°W		1803	The monument is in the garden of Newstead Abbey, and is to the memory of Boatswain, the favourite dog of Lord Byron. It is in stone, and consists of a round plinth of seven steps, the top two steps moulded, on which is a square chest with coved corners, and a depressed pyramidal lid with an urn finial. On each side of the chest is a marble tablet with guilloché borders, one with a dedication and a verse by Byron.	II*
Abbeyfields Farmhouse; 53.07104°N 1.20761°W	—	c. 1830	The farmhouse is in brick on a cogged plinth, with stone dressings, a floor band, and a pantile roof with stepped coped gables and obelisk finials. There are two storeys and a double depth plan, with parallel gabled ranges. On the south front is a gabled porch with an arched opening, and a doorway with a four-centred arched head. The windows are casements, some are mullioned, and most have hood moulds.	II
Sundial in garden 53.07815°N 1.19194°W		Mid 19th century	The sundial east of the south east wing of Newstead Abbey is in stone. It has a round base of two steps, and a moulded octagonal plinth. On this is a bracketed square stem, and it has an octagonal top with a signed bronze dial.	II
Sundial in Cloister Garth; 53.07850°N 1.19264°W		1856	The sundial is in stone, it has a square plinth of two steps, and a round stem with a moulded base. On this is a re-set marble capital, and an inscribed bronze dial.	II
West Lodge, gate and wall 53.07371°N 1.20233°W		1862	The lodge is in stone on a chamfered plinth, and has a slate roof with coped gables. There is a single storey and three bays. The doorway has a Tudor arch and a hood mould, and the windows are cusped and traceried lancets. The dwarf boundary wall has a railing, a square pier and a wicket gate. The adjoining boundary walls are curved and contain square piers.	II
Stable Range; 53.07951°N 1.19516°W		1862–63	The stable range to the north of Newstead Abbey was designed by M. E. Hadfield. It is in stone on a chamfered plinth, with moulded string courses, and slate roofs with coped gables and finials. There is a single storey and attics, and fronts of five bays, and has a rectangular plan around a courtyard. On the entrance front is a gabled gatehouse, to the right of which is a square tower that has an eaves band with gargoyles, and a pyramidal roof with a traceried bell turret and a wind vane. Elsewhere, most of the windows are double lancets with ogee heads, and there are gabled dormers.	II
Fernery Wall; 53.07663°N 1.19143°W		1864	The wall in the fernery in the grounds of Newstead Abbey is in stone, about 5 metres (16 ft) long, and contains a round-arched alcove, the arch composed of chamfered stones forming a chevron pattern. Set into the wall are terracotta bricks, each with a circular recess for a bowl or pot, and a hole for draining.	II
Grotto; 53.07659°N 1.19147°W		1864	The grotto is built into a bank in the fernery in the grounds of Newstead Abbey. It is in stone, partly coated in concrete, there are two openings, and the interior is in Derbyshire tufa.	II
Railway Overbridge; 53.06961°N 1.21851°W		c. 1875	The bridge carried a line from the colliery railway over Station Avenue. It consists of a single segmental arch in cast iron, with stone piers on chamfered plinths. The arch has pierced spandrels and a dentilled sill, and there is a moulded iron balustrade with cusped lancet openings.	II
Fountain (north); 53.07891°N 1.19255°W		Late 19th century	The fountain in the garden 70 metres (230 ft) north of Newstead Abbey is in stone. It consists of a lobed round bowl with moulded coping, base and plinth. It has a baluster-shaped stem, the bowl has scale ornament, and the fountain is surrounded by a shaped coped kerb.	II
Fountain (northeast); 53.07870°N 1.19218°W		Late 19th century	The fountain in the garden 50 metres (160 ft) northeast of Newstead Abbey is in stone. It consists of a moulded octagonal bowl with a waterholding base, and a frieze of blank shields. The central spout is made from a fragment of medieval carved stone.	II
Fountain (southeast); 53.07725°N 1.19052°W		Late 19th century	The fountain in the garden 200 metres (660 ft) southeast of Newstead Abbey is in stone. It consists of a lobed round bowl with moulded coping, base and plinth. It has a baluster-shaped stem, the bowl has scale ornament, and the fountain is surrounded by a shaped coped kerb.	II
War memorial 53.07116°N 1.22502°W	—	1920	The war memorial is in an enclosure in a grassed area, and is in granite. It consists of a wheel-head cross on a tapering shaft, on a tapering plinth, on a base of three rectangular steps. On the sides of the plinth are plaques with inscriptions and the names of those lost in the two World Wars.	II
