= William Frederick Webb =

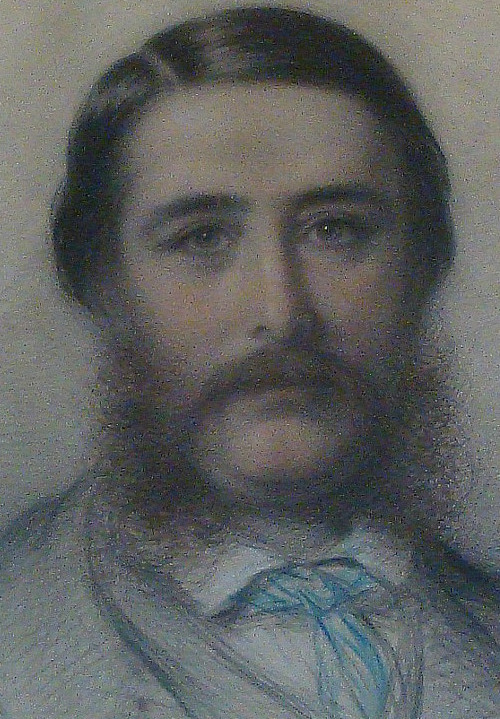
W F Webb

William Frederick Webb (1829–1899) was a High Sheriff of Nottinghamshire and officer in the British Army.

== Life ==
William Frederick Webb was born in Sussex in March 1829, one of four children of Frederick Webb and Mary Shiel. His father, who died on 4 February 1846, was an illegitimate son of Sir John Webb, having a brother John who had been declared a lunatic. John Webb, who stood to inherit an income from the estates of Sir John, was at that time under medical care in France, and had an illegitimate daughter. A court case began in April 1846. Ultimately, William Frederick Webb inherited estates in Yorkshire, Lincolnshire and County Durham, making him a wealthy man.

Webb was educated at Eton College and later joined the army, becoming a Captain in the 17th Lancers.

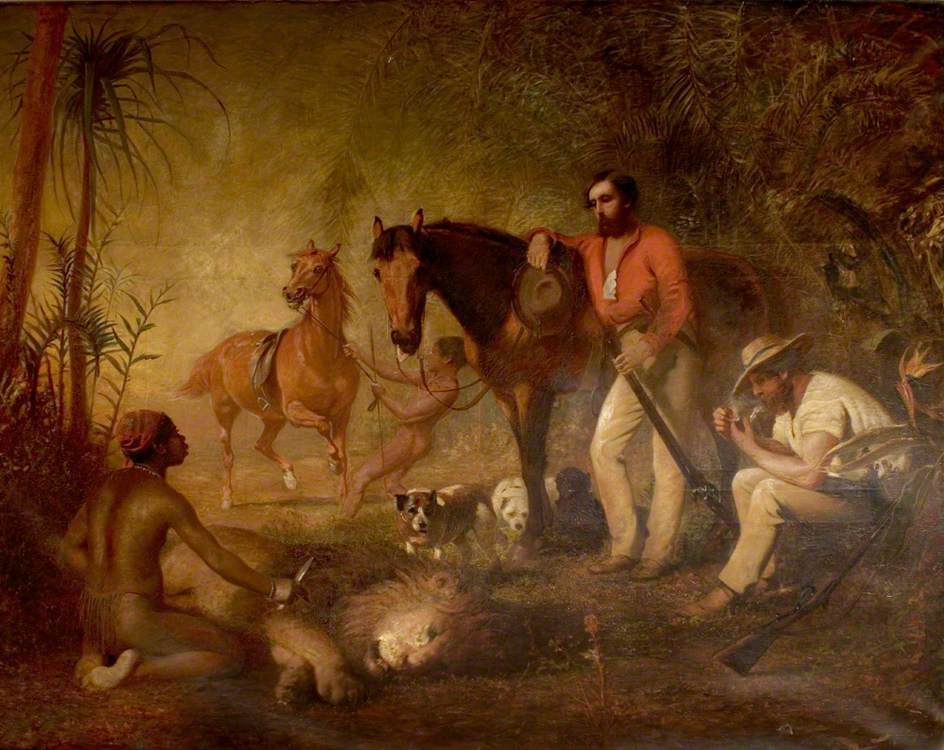
After the Lion Hunt, 1857 painting by Alfred Corbould, showing William Frederick Webb and Captain William Codrington

A big-game hunter, particularly of rhinoceros, Webb spent time in Africa with a friend, Captain William Codrington. In 1851 Webb became ill with fever and they summoned the explorer David Livingstone to assist. Webb recovered and came to know the Livingstones at Kolobeng Mission.

In 1860, Webb, now married, resided at Pepper Hall in Yorkshire. He purchased Newstead Abbey in Nottinghamshire from Thomas Wildman, a deal completed in 1861, for £147,000. Another potential purchaser had been Queen Victoria. He moved his family into the Abbey, and set about improvements, installing heating and gas lighting and also redecorating the old chapel. His wife sought out memorabilia of Lord Byron, who had owned it.

Webb's hunting trophies remain in Newstead today: the tusks, skins and heads of the animals he killed while in Africa. Livingstone made regular trips to Newstead, sometimes staying for months.

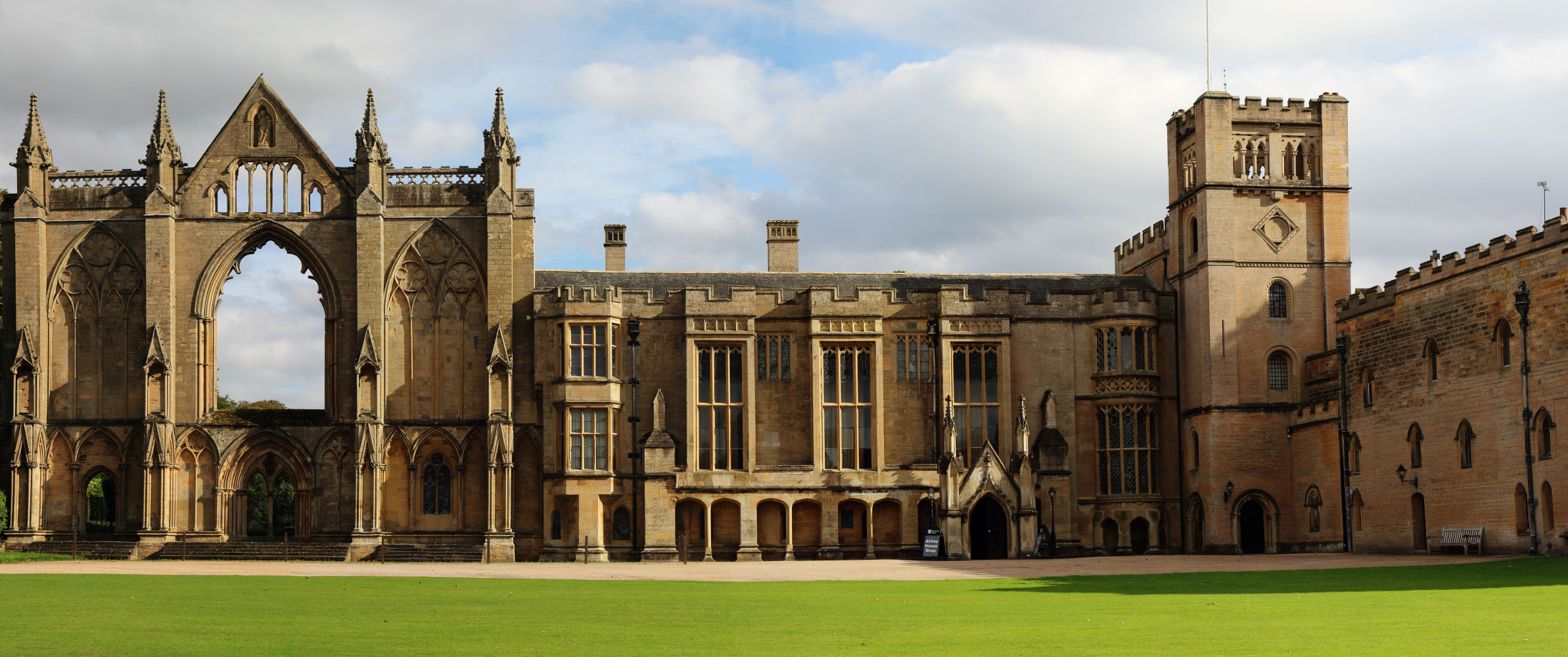
Newstead Abbey today

Webb was also a magistrate. In 1865 he became High Sheriff of Nottinghamshire.

== Later life and death ==
In 1889, his wife Emilia became ill with tuberculosis and journeyed to Africa in October that year, in hope that the warm climate would help her recovery. On 28 December 1889, she died, aged 63. She was buried in the cemetery of St John's church, Wynberg, Cape Town, South Africa. The white marble grave is still in good condition as at 2009 and states her age at death as being 55. It features a design on it that reflects motifs seen throughout Newstead Abbey.

Ten years later, in 1899, Webb contracted laryngitis while in Africa. He died from it and is buried at Luxor in Egypt.

When Webb died, Newstead Abbey was passed through each of his surviving children until Webb's grandson Charles Ian Fraser sold it to Sir Julien Cahn, who then gave it to Nottingham City Council in 1931.

== Family ==
On 15 July 1857, Webb married Emilia Jane, daughter of Thomas Mills Goodlake of Wadley House at Littleworth in Berkshire (now Oxfordshire), and sister of Gerald Goodlake VC. Together they had seven children:

- Augusta Zelia Webb (1858), writer, married Philip Affleck Fraser.
- Geraldine Katharine Webb (1860); married Herbert Chermside.
- Wilfred Webb (1861); died at three months.
- Ethel Mary Webb (1862)
- Mabel Cecilia Webb (1864)
- Algernon Frederick Webb (1865); committed suicide by shooting himself in the head whilst at Cambridge in 1884. This was attributed at the inquest to altered behaviour following a serious riding accident.
- Roderick Beauclerk Webb (1867)
