= Westwick, County Durham =

Village in County Durham, England

Coordinates: 54.535°N 1.891°W

Westwick
- Location within County Durham
- OS grid reference: NZ071155
- Unitary authority: County Durham
- Ceremonial county: County Durham
- Region: North East
- Country: England
- Sovereign state: United Kingdom
- Post town: Darlington
- Postcode district: DL12
- Police: Durham
- Fire: County Durham and Darlington
- Ambulance: North East

Westwick is a village in County Durham, in England. The population of the civil parish was less than 100. Details are maintained in the parish of Whorlton. It is situated to the east of Barnard Castle near the River Tees.
