= Thomas Wildman =

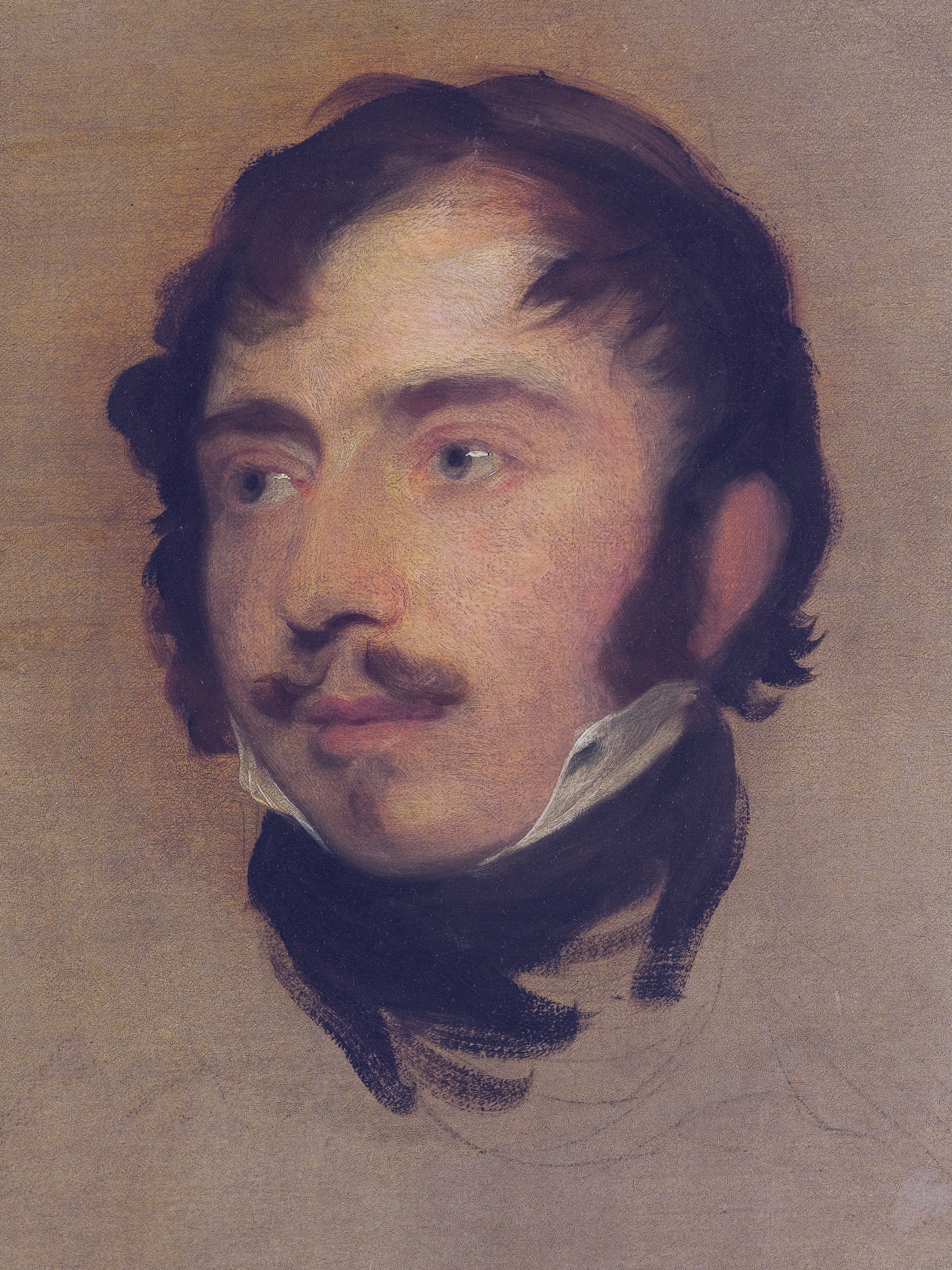
Colonel Thomas Wildman (1787–1859). (Unfinished portrait by Thomas Lawrence, 1831)

Colonel Thomas Wildman (1787–1859) was a British Army officer during the Napoleonic Wars, a draftsman, and landowner.

== Life ==
He was the eldest son of Thomas Wildman of Bacton Hall, Suffolk, by Sarah, daughter of Henry Hardinge, of Durham. A nephew of the political reformer John Horne Tooke and friend of Lord Byron at Harrow, Wildman purchased a cornetcy in the 7th Light Dragoons in 1808 and later the same year he was promoted lieutenant without purchase. At the Battle of Waterloo, he was an extra aide-de-camp to Lord Uxbridge. His letter after the battle described Uxbridge's wounding at the end of the battle (grapeshot to the knee) and the subsequent amputation. Wildman himself was slightly wounded in the battle. In 1816, he purchased a majority in the 2nd West India Regiment, and later transferred to the 9th Light Dragoons. In 1828, he became captain of the Mansfield Troop of the Nottinghamshire Yeomanry and a few months later became major-commandant of the Sherwood Rangers Yeomanry. He was promoted colonel in the Army in 1837. In 1840, he transferred to be lieutenant-colonel of the 5th Dragoon Guards.

He recorded his service during the Peninsular War in a diary, which was subsequently published.

The Wildman family had obtained Quebec Estate, a large sugar plantation in Jamaica, from William Beckford, who was having financial problems. The wealth generated from this plantation provided Wildman with the means to purchase Newstead Abbey in 1818 for £95,000. The Abbey was owned by his friend and old schoolmate, Lord Byron who, like Beckford, was having financial difficulties. Byron had been trying to sell the Abbey since 1812. Of the sale, Byron's half-sister Augusta said Wildman had "soul enough to value the dear Abbey..."

Although Wildman's purchase ended almost four centuries of Byron family ownership of the Abbey, he was considered to be the man who saved Byron's home. He spent £100,000 restoring it, hiring the architect John Shaw to make improvements. He also amassed a large collection of Byron memorabilia there. He served as High Sheriff of Nottinghamshire for 1821–22.

The Wildmans entertained many guests who wished to visit the home of Lord Byron, including Franz Liszt and Washington Irving. The Duke of Sussex visited annually for a six-week holiday with his chaplain. After Wildman's death, Louisa sold the Abbey to William Frederick Webb.

== Personal life ==
In 1816, he married a Swiss woman, Louisa Preisig. They had no children.
