= Jacob Wainwright =

Yao freed slave and missionary assistant to David Livingstone

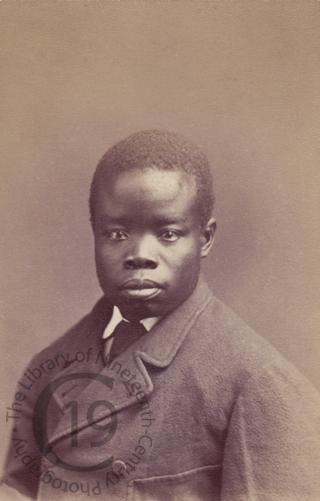
- Portrait of Jacob Wainwright by Elliott and Fry
- Born: Yamuza c. 1859; Near Lake Malawi (in present-day Malawi)
- Died: April 1892 (aged about 33); Urambo District, German East Africa (in present-day Tanzania)
- Occupations: Porter, servant, interpreter, teacher, missionary assistant
- Known for: Transporting the body of David Livingstone

Jacob Wainwright (born Yamuza; c. 1859 – April 1892) was a freed slave of Yao origin who became an attendant of David Livingstone. He was notable for helping to carry Livingstone’s body from present-day Zambia to the coast of East Africa in 1873, and for leaving one of the few surviving African eyewitness accounts of the explorer’s death and funeral journey.

== Early life ==
Wainwright's birth date is unknown; accounts of his age vary widely. Some accounts put him at being born in 1849/50, but other accounts estimate that he was about fourteen when he joined Livingstone's expedition, suggesting a birth date around 1859. He was born into the Yao people, who lived in East Africa, on the south of Lake Malawi, and given the name Yamuza.

In his teens, he was kidnapped by Arab slave traders. He was rescued by a British anti-slavery ship, baptised a Christian and given the name "Jacob Wainwright."

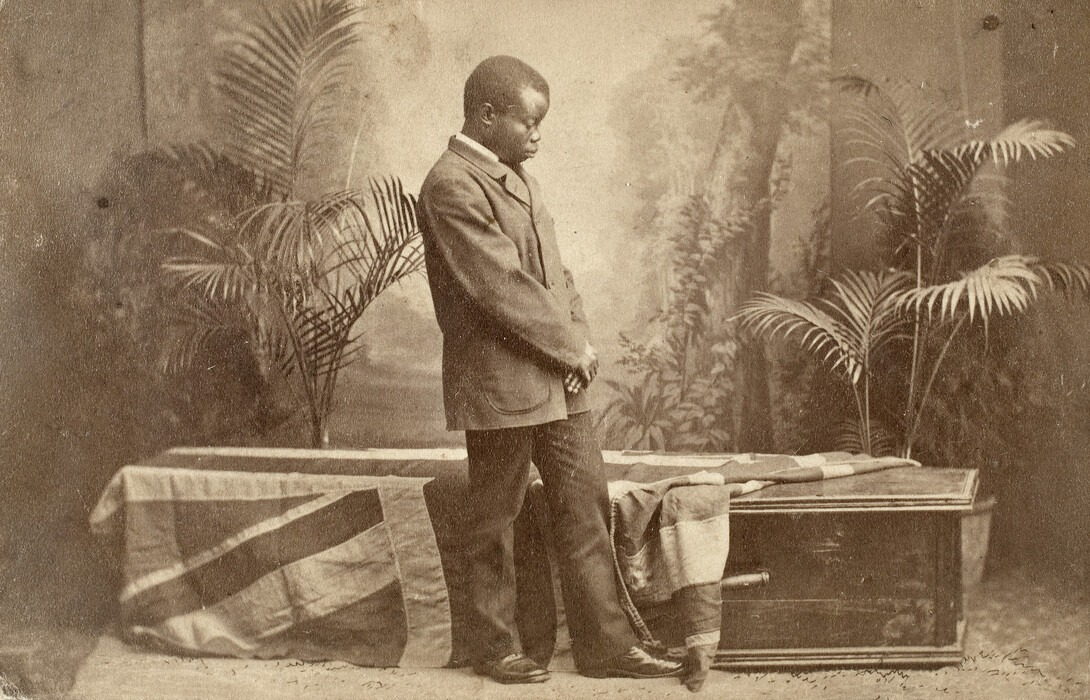
Wainwright photographed with Livingstone's coffin in 1874

Wainwright was educated at a Church Missionary Society school in Bombay, British India. He also stayed at the Nassick African Asylum for freed slaves in Nashik, India.

== With Livingstone ==
Aged about 14, Wainwright was hired to accompany Dr. Livingstone as he explored East Africa.

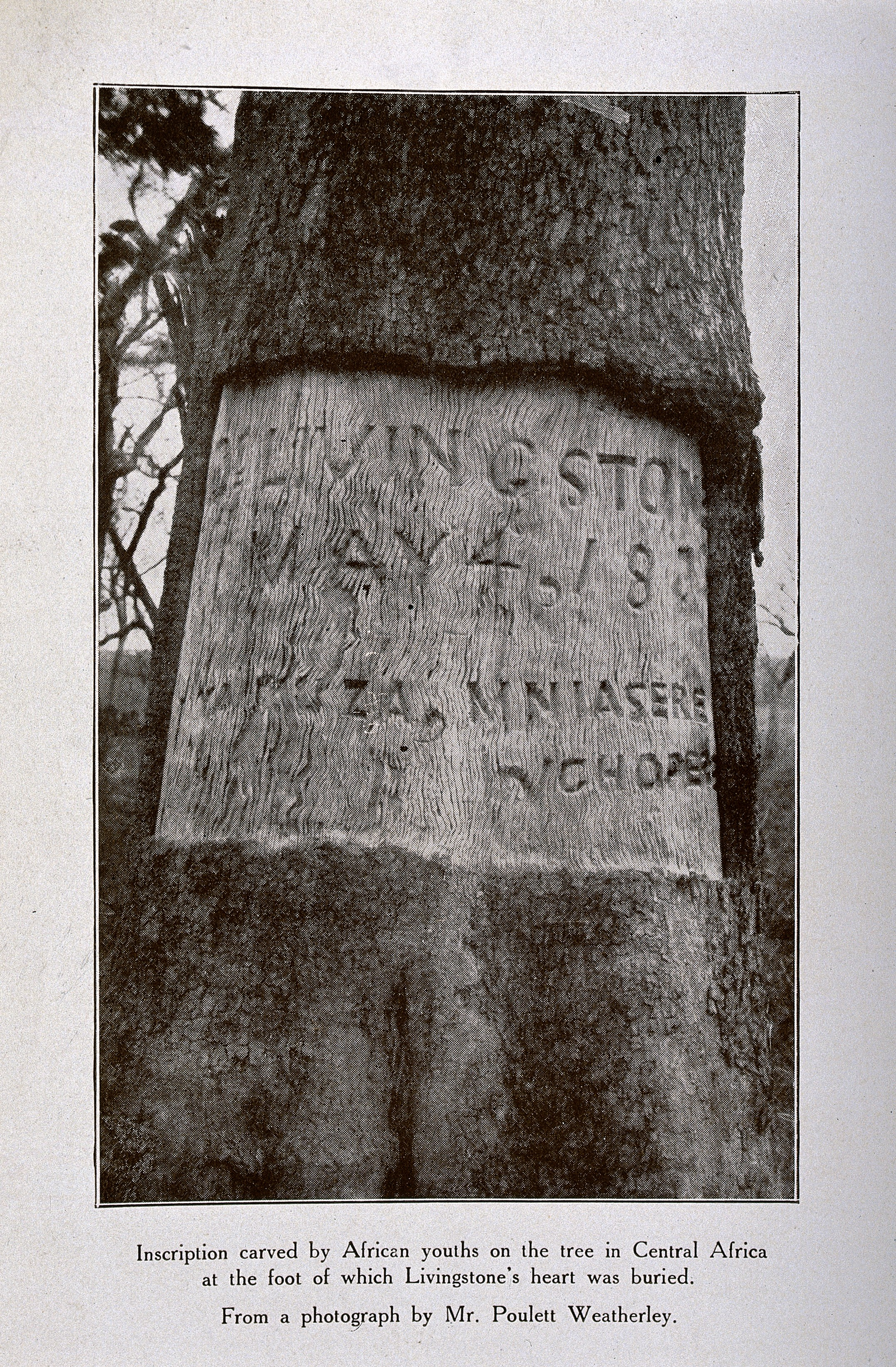
Inscription by Jacob Wainwright on the tree under which Livingstone was buried

Dr. Livingstone died at Ilala, near the edge of the Bangweulu Swamps (in modern Zambia) on 1 May 1873. Wainwright and two other Africans, Abdullah Susi and James Chuma, resolved to bring his body the 1,000 miles (1,600 km) to the British consulate at Bagamoyo in Zanzibar. Before the journey, Livingstone's heart and entrails were removed from his body and buried in an iron box. Wainwright recorded that a massive blood clot, possibly a cancerous tumour, was found in the lower bowel. At the burial ceremony Wainwright read from the Book of Common Prayer. He was also given the responsibility of making a full inventory of Livingstone's possessions. Before the party left Ilala, Wainwright carved the following inscription on the tree marking Livingstone's grave:

Dr. Livingstone
May 4, 1873
Yazuza, Miniasere
Vchopere

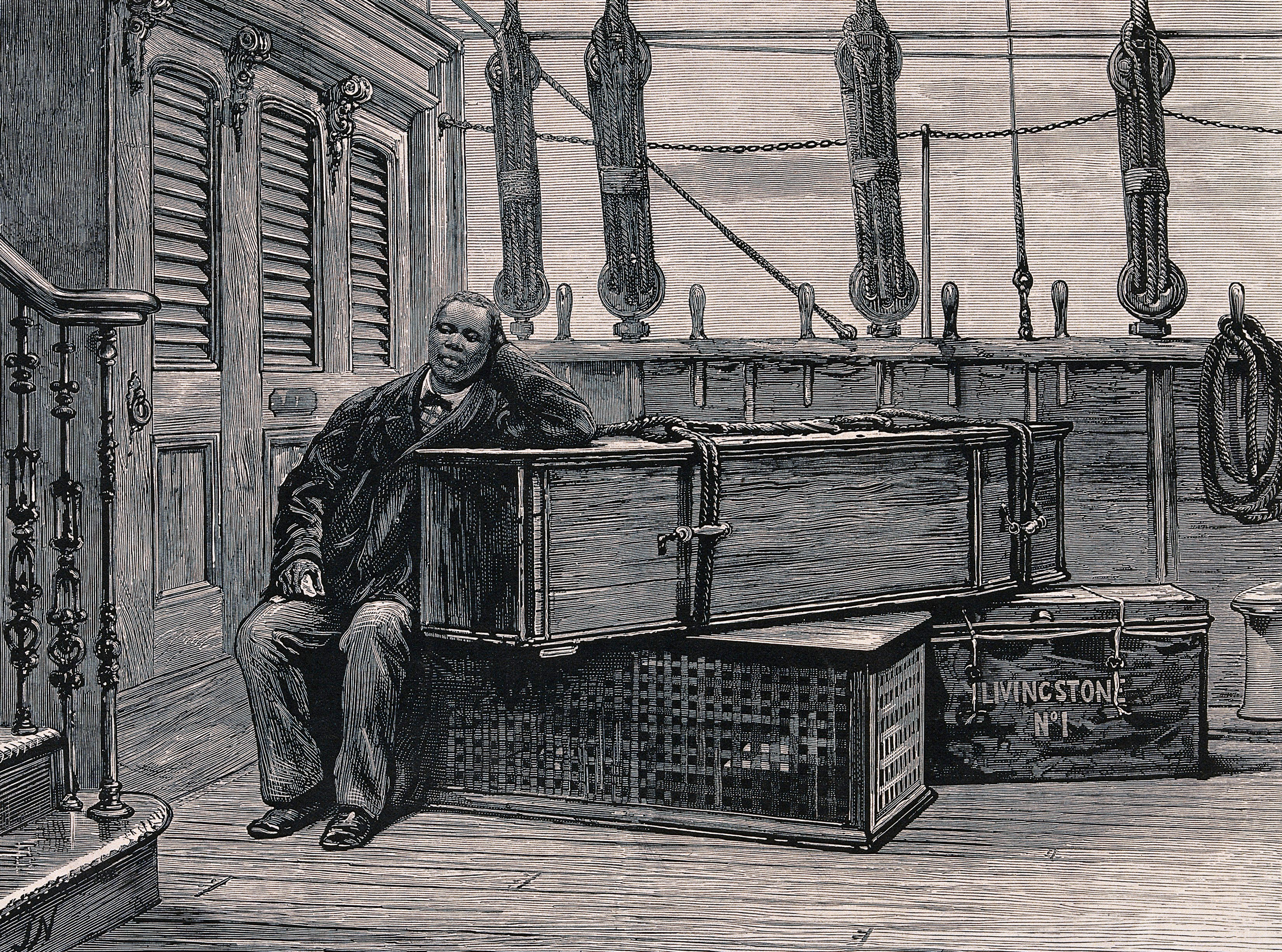
Jacob Wainwright accompanying David Livingstone's coffin on board the SS Malwa

As the most literate member of the party, Wainwright was also responsible for writing a letter to the relief expedition which included Livingstone's son, informing them that Dr Livingstone had died. At Zanzibar, it seems that the British assumed that Wainwright was the leader, despite his youth, because he was the only African servant who could speak and write in English. He was dispatched with the body for England, picking up with the Peninsular and Oriental liner the SS Malwa at Aden, and with the help of the explorer's son Thomas from Alexandria onwards, Wainwright guarded Livingstone's coffin on its journey to Britain. Wainwright was the only African among the eight pallbearers at the explorer’s funeral in Westminster Abbey on 18 April 1874.

== Later life and death ==
Following Livingstone's death Wainwright stayed in England at Kessingland, Suffolk and travelled across the country addressing meetings of the Church Missionary Society. On 18 August 1874, he went to teach freed slaves at Kisulidini, near Mombasa. He was dismissed from this job in 1876. There are also accounts of Wainwright teaching at a school at Frere Town, a settlement for freed slaves north of Mombasa.

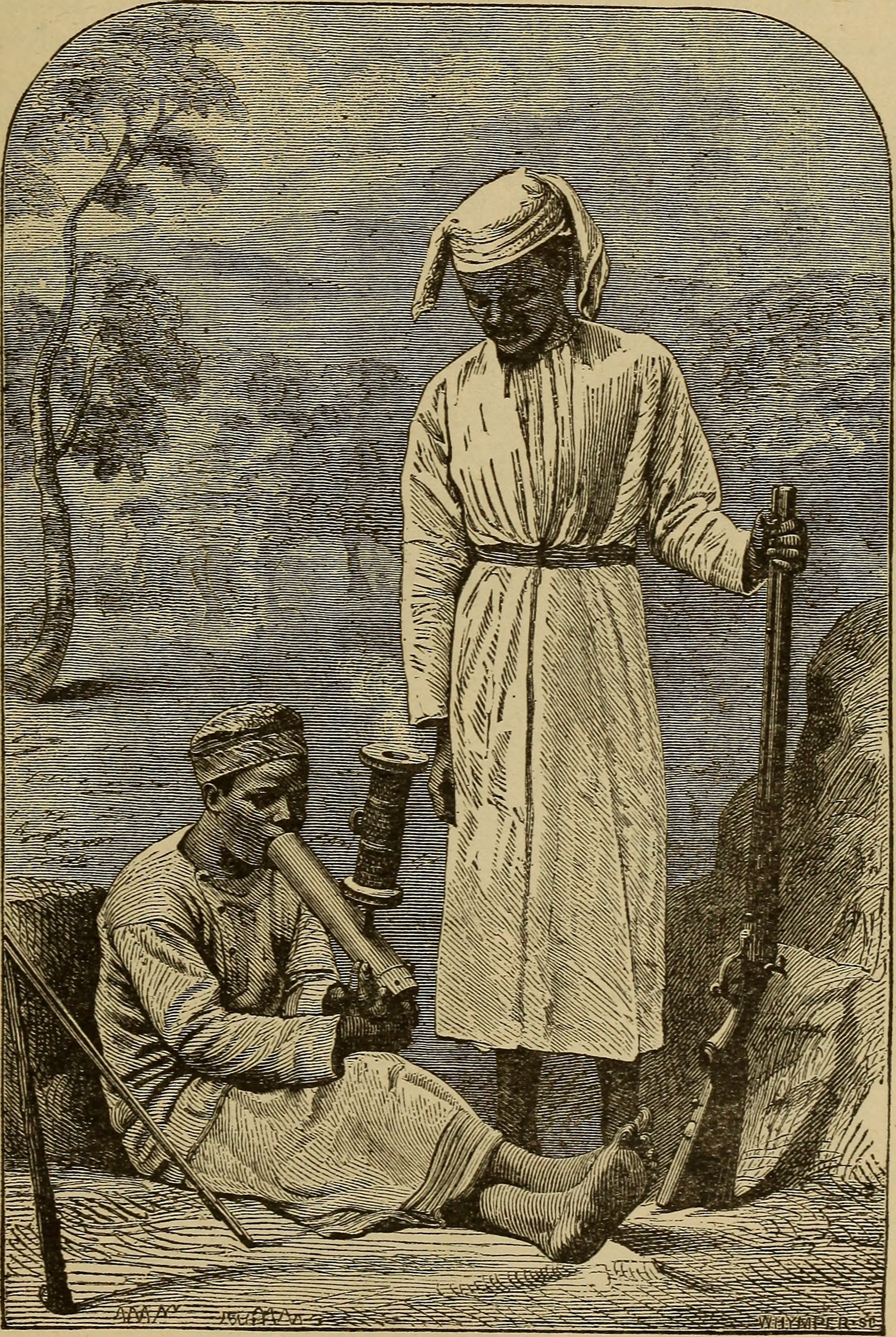
Wainwright's companions, Susi and Chuma (from Stanley and the White Heroes in Africa, 1890)

By 1879, Wainwright was working as a door-porter in Zanzibar, following his dismissal from his previous position as a result of "impudent and forward" behaviour. In 1881 he was hired as interpreter, teacher and personal servant by the missionary Philip O'Flaherty. They travelled to Lubaga (Rubaga) together, where Wainwright was hired by Muteesa I of Buganda. In 1884, Wainwright joined a mission led by Edward C. Hore and in the late 1880s he joined the London Missionary Society mission in Urambo District, German East Africa (modern Tanzania) where he translated hymns and passages of scripture.

Wainwright died at the Urambo Mission in April 1892 as a result of burns and scalds from falling onto a fire and upturning a pot of water. He was buried near his hut, his grave marked by a borassus palm until in 1931 the Moravian Church, Salem, North Carolina, USA presented a metal tablet to be laid at his grave.

== Legacy ==
Wainwright recorded his experiences on the Livingstone mission. One diary that detailed the bringing of Livingstone's body to the Swahili coast for repatriation to Great Britain was published by the Hakluyt Society in 2007. In 2019, one of Wainwright's entire handwritten diaries, as well as a few personal letters, were digitized and made available online. The diary is valued, as few indigenous Black African servants of white European explorers are known to have written about their experiences.
