= Gerald Goodlake =

Lieutenant-General Gerald Goodlake VC
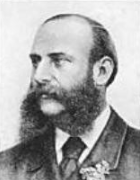
- Born: 14 May 1832; Wadley, Faringdon, England
- Died: 5 April 1890 (aged 57); Denham, Buckinghamshire, England
- Burial place: St Mary the Virgin Churchyard, Harefield
- Relatives: Sir Edward Baker, 1st Baronet (father-in-law)
- Military career
- Allegiance: United Kingdom
- Branch: British Army
- Rank: Lieutenant-General
- Units: 21st Regiment of Foot; Coldstream Guards
- Conflicts: Crimean War
- Awards: Victoria Cross; Legion of Honour (France); Order of the Medjidie (Ottoman Empire)

Lieutenant-General Gerald Littlehales Goodlake VC (14 May 1832 – 5 April 1890) was an English recipient of the Victoria Cross, the highest and most prestigious award for gallantry in the face of the enemy that can be awarded to British and Commonwealth forces.

== Early life ==
Gerald Goodlake was the son of Thomas Mills Goodlake of Wadley at Faringdon in Berkshire (now Oxfordshire) and his wife, Emilia Maria, the daughter of Sir Edward Baker, 1st Baronet of Ranston in Dorset. He was commissioned into the 21st Regiment of Foot on 14 June 1850. He exchanged (by purchase) into the Coldstream Guards on 27 June 1851. He served in the Crimea with the 1st Battalion and took part in the battles of Alma, Inkerman, Balaclava and Sevastopol.

== Victoria Cross ==
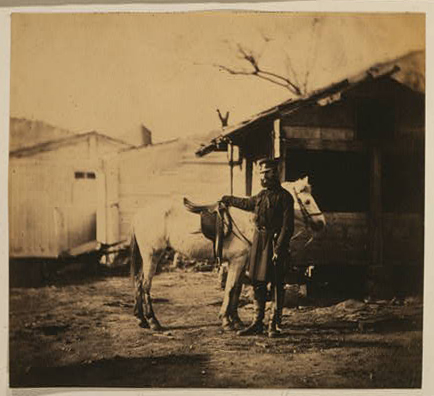
Colonel Goodlake in 1854

Goodlake was 22 years old, and a brevet major in the Coldstream Guards, British Army during the Crimean War when the following deed took place for which he was awarded the VC.

On 28 October 1854 at Inkerman, Crimea, Major Goodlake was in command of a party of sharpshooters which held Windmill Ravine against a much larger force of the enemy, killing 38 (including an officer) and taking three prisoners. He also showed conspicuous gallantry on a later occasion when his sharpshooters surprised a picquet and seized the knapsacks and rifles of the enemy.

He later achieved the rank of lieutenant general.

His Victoria Cross is displayed at The Guards Regimental Headquarters (Grenadier Guards RHQ) in Wellington Barracks, London, England.
