= Chandor (surname) =

Chandor is a surname. Notable people with the surname include:

- Douglas Chandor (1897–1953), British-born portrait painter and garden designer
  - Chandor Gardens, in Weatherford, Texas, US
- J. C. Chandor (born 1973), American filmmaker
- John Arthur Chandor (1850–1909), American businessman and bigamist
- Valentine Chandor (1875–1935), American educator
