= Mineral Wells =

Mineral Wells or similar may refer to:

== Places in the United States ==
- Mineral Well Park, Petoskey, Michigan
- Mineral Wells, Mississippi, an unincorporated community
- Mineral Wells, Texas, a town of about 15,000
  - Mineral Wells Airport
  - Mineral Wells Independent School District
- Mineral Wells, an area including a picnic area in north Griffith Park, Los Angeles, California
- Mineralwells, West Virginia

== Other ==
- Mineral Wells Formation, a geologic formation in Texas
- Mineral Wells Index, a former newspaper in Texas
- Mineral Wells Resorters, a baseball team in Texas in the 1920s
