= National Register of Historic Places listings in Parker County, Texas =

Location of Parker County in Texas

This is a list of the National Register of Historic Places listings in Parker County, Texas.

This is intended to be a complete list of properties and districts listed on the National Register of Historic Places in Parker County, Texas. There are two districts and three individual properties listed on the National Register in the county. One property is both a State Antiquities Landmark (SAL) and a Recorded Texas Historic Landmark (RTHL) and is part of a historic district containing several more RTHLs. Another individually listed property is also an RTHL. An additional property was formerly listed on the National Register. This property remains an SAL.

This National Park Service list is complete through NPS recent listings posted July 11, 2025.

== Current listings ==
The locations of National Register properties and districts may be seen in a mapping service provided.

	Name on the Register	Image	Date listed	Location	City or town	Description
1	Byron Farmstead	Byron Farmstead	March 29, 2007 (#07000217)	905 Meadowview Rd. 32°46′03″N 97°43′21″W	Weatherford	
2	Chandor Gardens	Chandor Gardens	August 18, 2014 (#14000498)	711 West Lee Street; 32°45′16″N 97°48′28″W	Weatherford	Recorded Texas Historic Landmark
3	Parker County Courthouse	Parker County Courthouse	June 21, 1971 (#71000957)	Courthouse Sq. 32°45′32″N 97°47′50″W	Weatherford	State Antiquities Landmark, Recorded Texas Historic Landmark
4	State Highway 89 Bridge at the Brazos River	State Highway 89 Bridge at the Brazos River	October 10, 1996 (#96001115)	I-20, 1.7 mi (2.7 km). W of jct. with FM 113; 32°40′00″N 98°01′59″W	Millsap vicinity	
5	Weatherford Downtown Historic District	Weatherford Downtown Historic District	November 23, 1990 (#90001745)	Roughly bounded by Waco, Water, Walnut and Lee Sts. 32°45′33″N 97°47′46″W	Weatherford	Includes Recorded Texas Historic Landmark

== Former listing ==
	Name on the Register	Image	Date listed	Date removed	Location	City or town	Description
1	Tin Top Suspension Bridge		March 25, 1977 (#77001464)	October 19, 1983	2 mi. S of Tin Top on SR 1884; 32°45′23″N 97°49′21″W	Weatherford vicinity	State Antiquities Landmark; collapsed in a windstorm January 31, 1982.

== See also ==
- National Register of Historic Places listings in Texas
- Recorded Texas Historic Landmarks in Parker County
