= Parker County Courthouse =

- Parker County courthouse
- U.S. National Register of Historic Places
- U.S. Historic district – Contributing property
- Texas State Antiquities Landmark
- Recorded Texas Historic Landmark
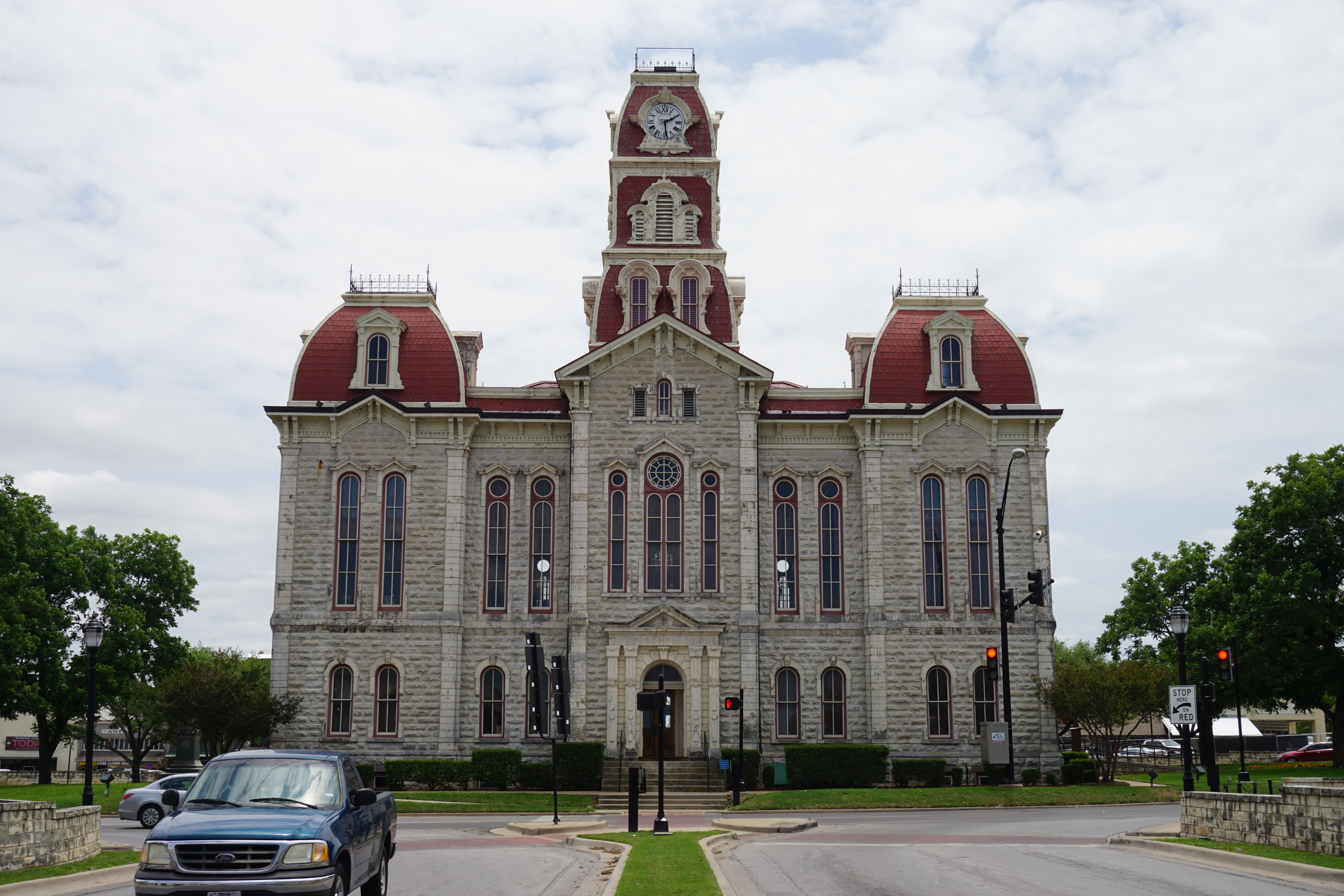

- Location within Texas Location within the United States
- Location: Courthouse Sq., Weatherford, Texas
- Coordinates: 32°45′32″N 97°47′49″W
- Area: 1 acre (0.40 ha)
- Built: 1884–1886
- Architect: W.C. Dodson
- Architectural style: Second Empire
- Part of: Weatherford Downtown Historic District (ID90001745)
- NRHP reference No.: 71000957
- TSAL No.: 8200000508
- RTHL No.: 3939

Significant dates
- Added to NRHP: June 21, 1971
- Designated CP: November 23, 1990
- Designated TSAL: May 28, 1981
- Designated RTHL: 1965

The Parker County Courthouse is a historic building located at Courthouse Square in Weatherford, Texas, the seat of Parker County. Built in 1884–1886, it was the county's fourth courthouse; the first was a wooden building, and the second and third both burned down. Architect Wesley Clark Dodson, who designed at least six courthouses in Texas, designed the Second Empire building. The three-story limestone building is visually divided into five bays; the end and central bays are projecting and feature stone pilasters at their corners. The second-story windows are tall and arched, and the roof line features bracketing around the eaves. The red shingled roof has two mansards atop the ends and a three-story tower in the center; each piece features dormers and a widow's walk, while the tower has louvers and a clock on its upper stories.

The courthouse was added to the National Register of Historic Places on 1965.

== See also ==
- National Register of Historic Places listings in Parker County, Texas
- Recorded Texas Historic Landmarks in Parker County
- List of county courthouses in Texas
