= Hillwood Estate, Museum & Gardens =

Decorative arts museum in Washington, D.C.

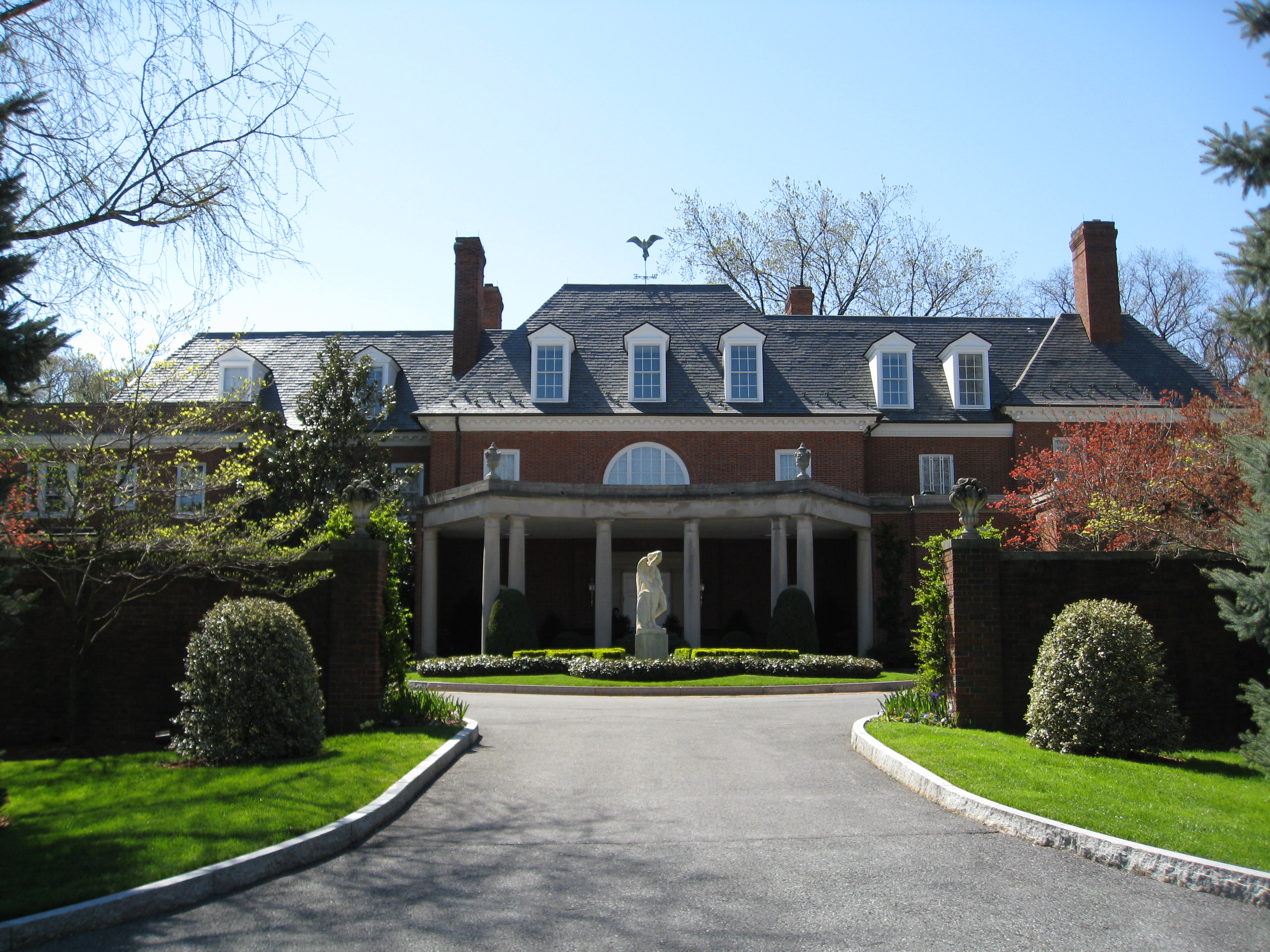
- Hillwood Estate

- Location within Washington, D.C. Hillwood Estate, Museum & Gardens (the United States)
- Established: 1973
- Location: 4155 Linnean Ave. NW; Washington, D.C. 20008
- Coordinates: 38.9437°N 77.0526°W
- Type: Decorative Arts
- Director: Kate Markert
- Public transit access: Van Ness–UDC
- Website: www.hillwoodmuseum.org

Hillwood Estate, Museum & Gardens is a decorative arts and historic house museum in Washington, D.C. The former residence of businesswoman and philanthropist Marjorie Merriweather Post, Hillwood is known for its decorative arts collection that focuses heavily on the House of Romanov, including two Fabergé eggs. Other highlights are 18th and 19th-century French art and one of the country's finest orchid collections.

== History ==
Hillwood, then called Arbremont, was a Georgian revival mansion that had been built in the 1920s by Daisy Peck Blodgett, wife of Delos A. Blodgett Jr, a Michigan lumber tycoon and daughter of William H. Peck, for her daughter, Helen Blodgett Erwin. A second house known as The Rocks across Rock Creek Park was also built for her second daughter and was eventually purchased by Jay Rockefeller.

After Marjorie Merriweather Post acquired the property from the Erwins in 1955, she renamed it Hillwood, a name she had also used for her former property in Brookville, New York, and hired architect Alexander McIlvaine to rebuild its interior. The renovations, which included moving the library doors to frame a view of the Washington Monument, were completed in 1956.

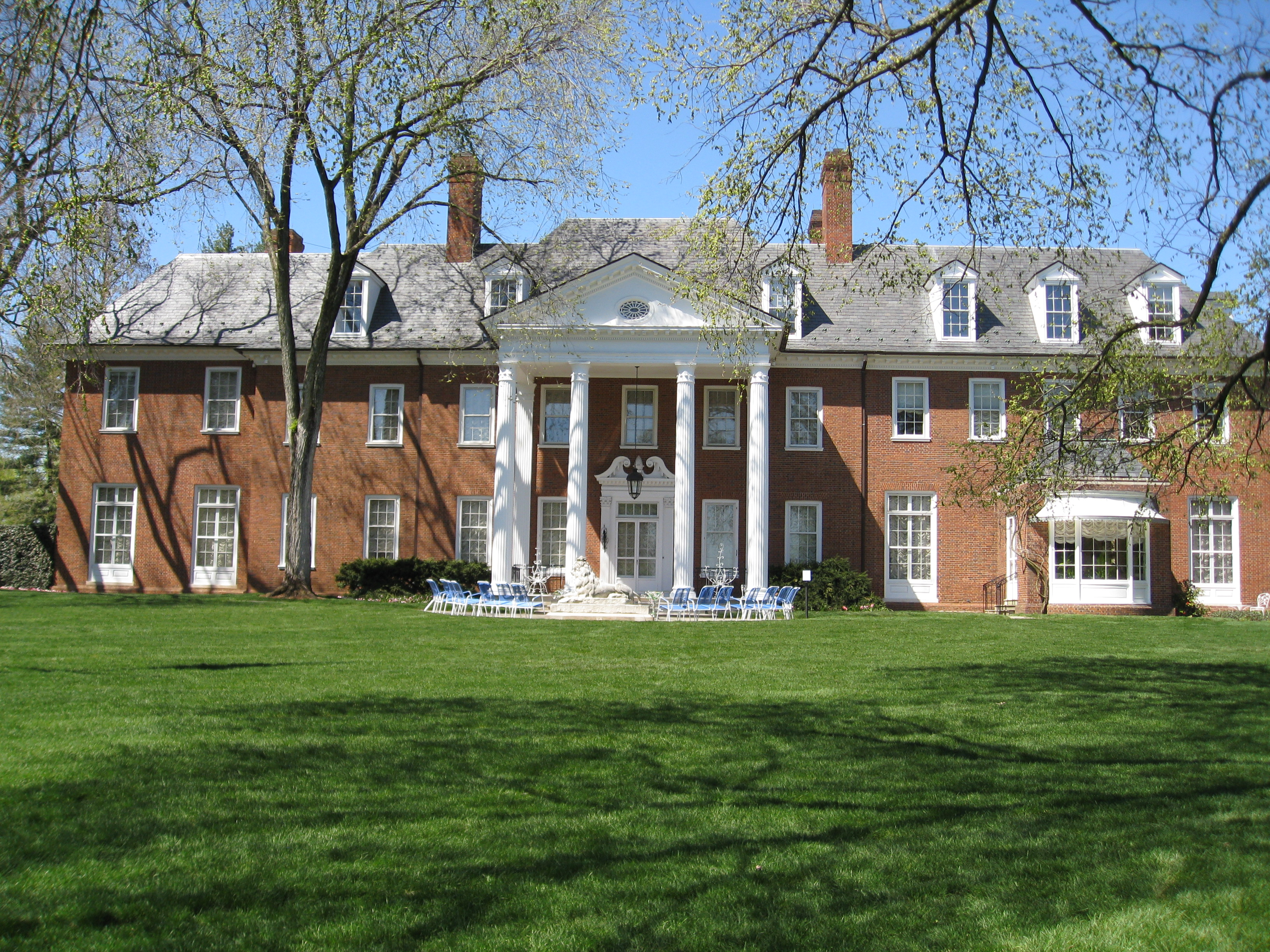
A view of the Lunar Lawn and Mansion

During her marriage with Davies, who served as the second ambassador to the Soviet Union in the mid-1930s, Post acquired a vast collection of objects from pre-Bolshevik Russia, including a chandelier from the Catherine Palace, and Fabergé artworks including the Twelve Monograms Easter egg. Post had her first guests to the house in May 1957 and hosted her first big party there on July 7, 1957. Hillwood quickly gained a reputation as one of Washington's "most extraordinary estates."

Concerned with Hillwood's fate after her death, Post arranged in 1962 to bequeath the estate, along with a $10 million endowment to maintain it, to the Smithsonian Institution. She made the bequest of Hillwood, as well as most of her other properties, contingent upon it being maintained and used according to her wishes, and established the Marjorie Merriweather Post Foundation of the District of Columbia to ensure compliance. Post was residing at Hillwood when she died on September 12, 1973.

The Smithsonian declined to make the necessary changes needed to convert Hillwood into a museum, and complained that the endowment, producing $450,000 annual income, was insufficient to maintain the site. Accordingly, Hillwood and the majority of the collection was returned to the Post Foundation by April 1976 and the estate opened as a museum in 1977.

== Collections ==
Hillwood features over 17,000 objects from the original collection and selected objects collected after Post's death. Collection highlights include:

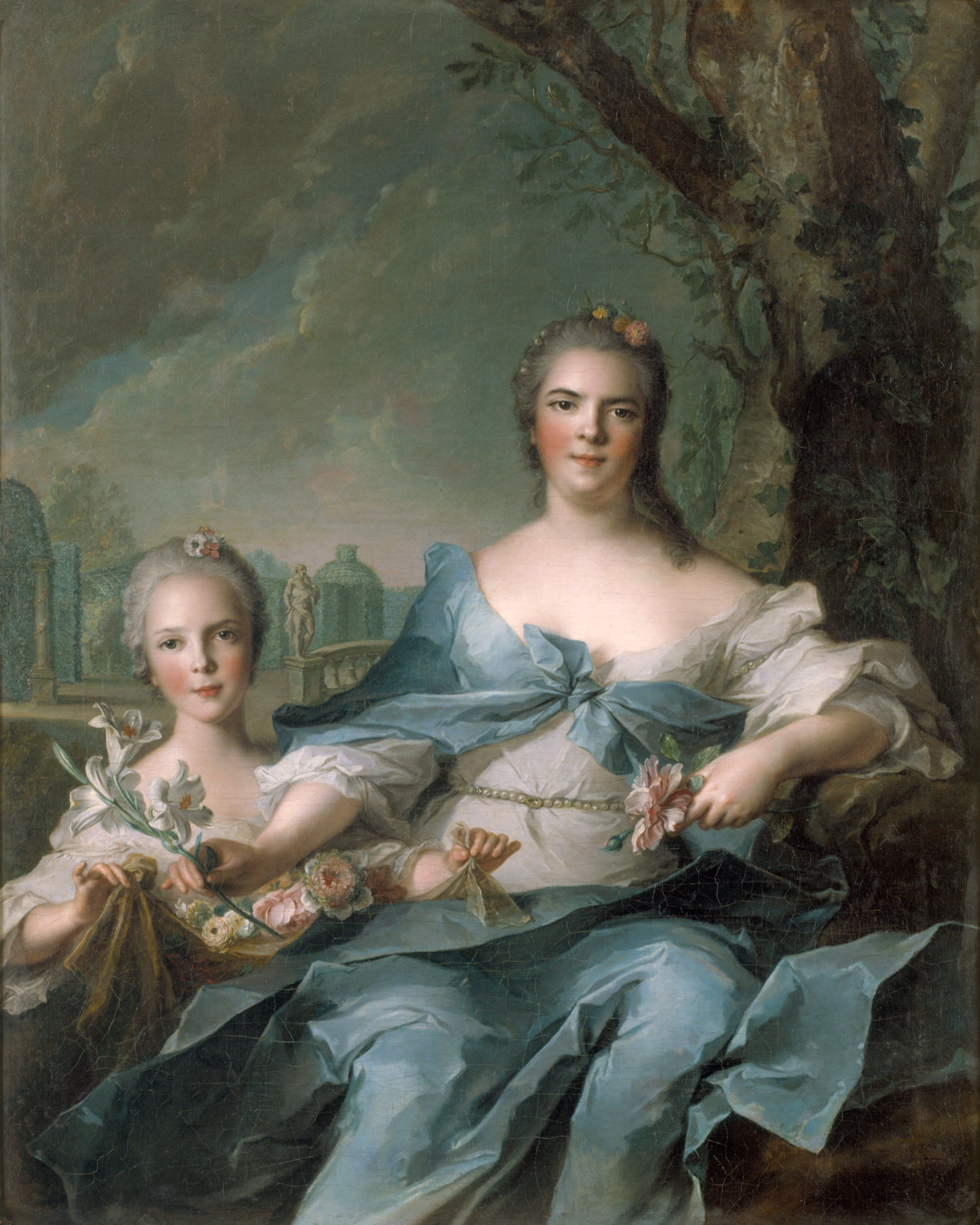
The Duchess of Parma and Her Daughter by Jean-March Nattier

- Portrait of Catherine the Great, a full-length portrait of Catherine II in her Russian elite finery
- Two Chests of Drawers designed by Jean-Henri Riesener, official cabinetmaker of Louis XVI and Marie Antoinette
- The Duchess of Parma and Her Daughter by Jean-Marc Nattier
- The Countess Samoilova and Her Foster Daughter by Karl Briullov, 1834
- A Boyar Wedding Feast by Konstantin Makovsky, 1883
- Two Imperial Easter Eggs by House of Fabergé that were gifts to Maria Fedorovna from her son Nicholas II of Russia
- Bleu Celeste Wares, from Manufacture nationale de Sèvres, including a tureen from 1754
- Mrs. Post Portrait by Douglas Chandor, 1952
- Felonion, Russian Orthodox liturgical vestment worn by a priest during the coronation of Nicholas II in 1896

Additional highlights include tapestries from the 1730s, tableware collected by Catherine the Great, Russian Orthodox Church objects such as icons and liturgical vessels, Wedgwood ceramics, bloodstone objects, and jewelry by Harry Winston and Cartier. In addition to the collection, Hillwood also offers appointment-only access to their Art Research Library, which features a notable selection of Russian and European decorative art books and documents.

== Gardens and grounds ==
In 1926, landscape architect Willard Gebhart created a landscape moulded around the 25 acres and estate later owned by Post. When renovating Hillwood, Post incorporated many of the garden designs into her interior design, creating the 'garden rooms' which feature touches unique to the Lunar Lawn and Rose Garden.

=== Motor court ===
Designed by Innocenti and Webel, the motor court was the first area of arrival for guests, who were escorted into the house from the porte-cochère by her butler. The hilly ascent and motor court walls served as a buffer that preserved the mystery of the mansion while on the approach, and the elliptical shape of the area allowed for an easy stream of cars in and out of the property. The center of the court features a statue of a young Eros surrounded by English ivy and boxwoods. Eros holds a goat and pulls an arrow from his quiver, representing fertility and love.

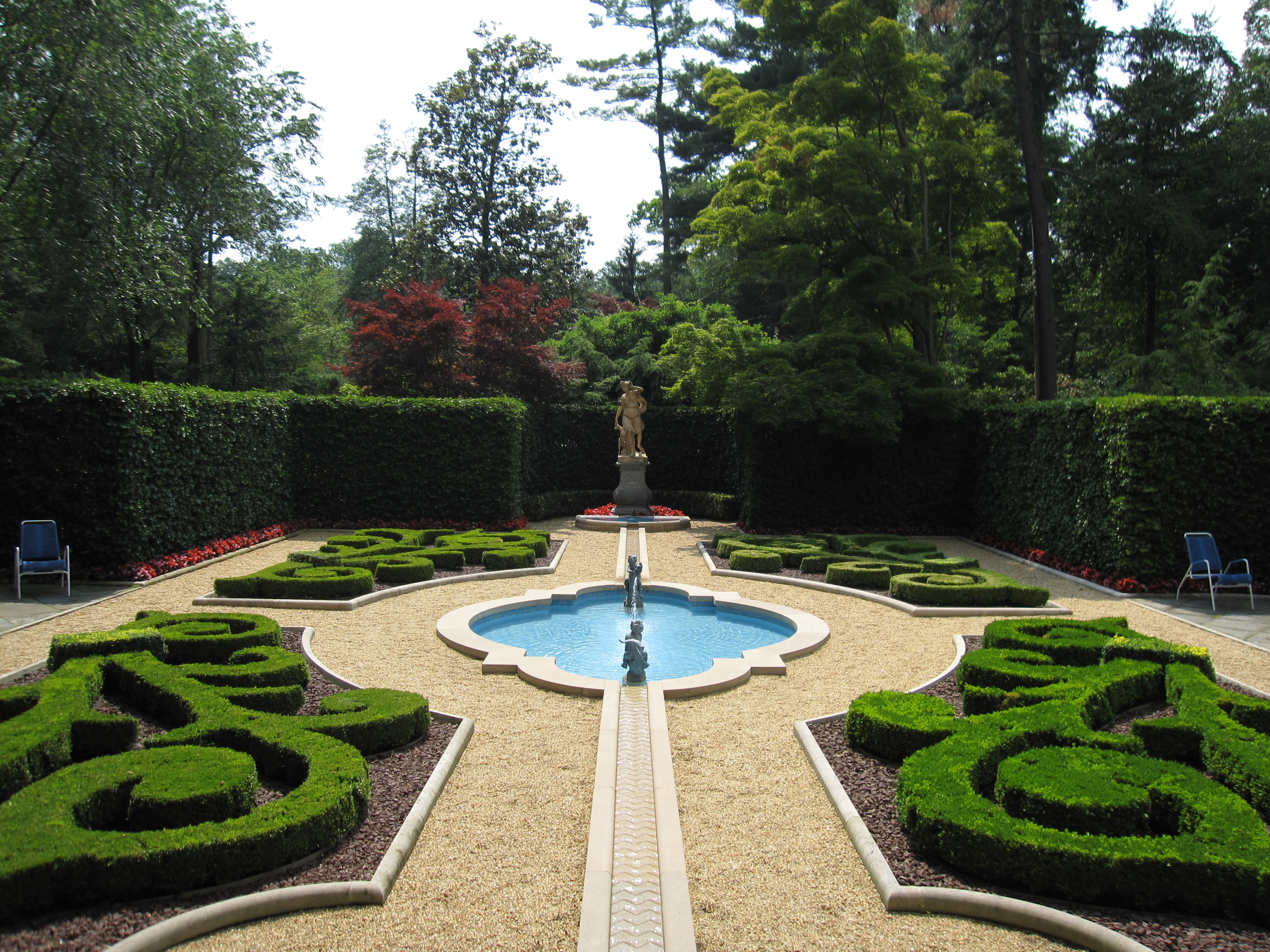
View of the French parterre

=== French parterre ===
Following the tradition of parterre gardens, the Hillwood parterre is a formal garden with low detailed plantings divided with footpaths and walls of English ivy. Also designed by Innocenti and Webel, the garden was split into four areas using channels of moving water, gravel footpaths and a central pool lined with Italian glass tile. A terracotta sculpture of Diana overlooks the garden. She is accompanied by marble sphinxes, a cherub riding sea animals in the central pool, as well as outdoor furniture from Post's collection. This garden serves as a Post's tribute to 18th-century French aristocracy.

=== Rose garden ===
In 1956, Post hired Perry Hunt Wheeler, who designed the White House rose garden, to update the Hillwood rose garden to her current tastes. Each bed is planted with a single variety of floribunda rose which bloom in the summer. A wood and brick pergola travels through the rose garden with climbing roses and white wisteria, which is finished with boxwood. Tulips and sweet alyssum also decorate the garden.

The rose garden also serves as the location of Post's ashes, which are placed in the base of a pink granite monument that is topped with an antique urn made of deep purple porphyry. The monument features her coat of arms and the inscription in Latin that translates as "All my hopes rest in me."

=== Friendship Walk ===
A simple English inspired garden walk was a gift to Post from her friends in 1957. It is lined with boxwood, rhododendrons, and azaleas. As a tribute to Post after her 70th birthday, 181 of her friends built "Friendship Walk", a path from Hillwood's rose garden to a crest overlooking Rock Creek Park.

=== Four seasons overlook ===
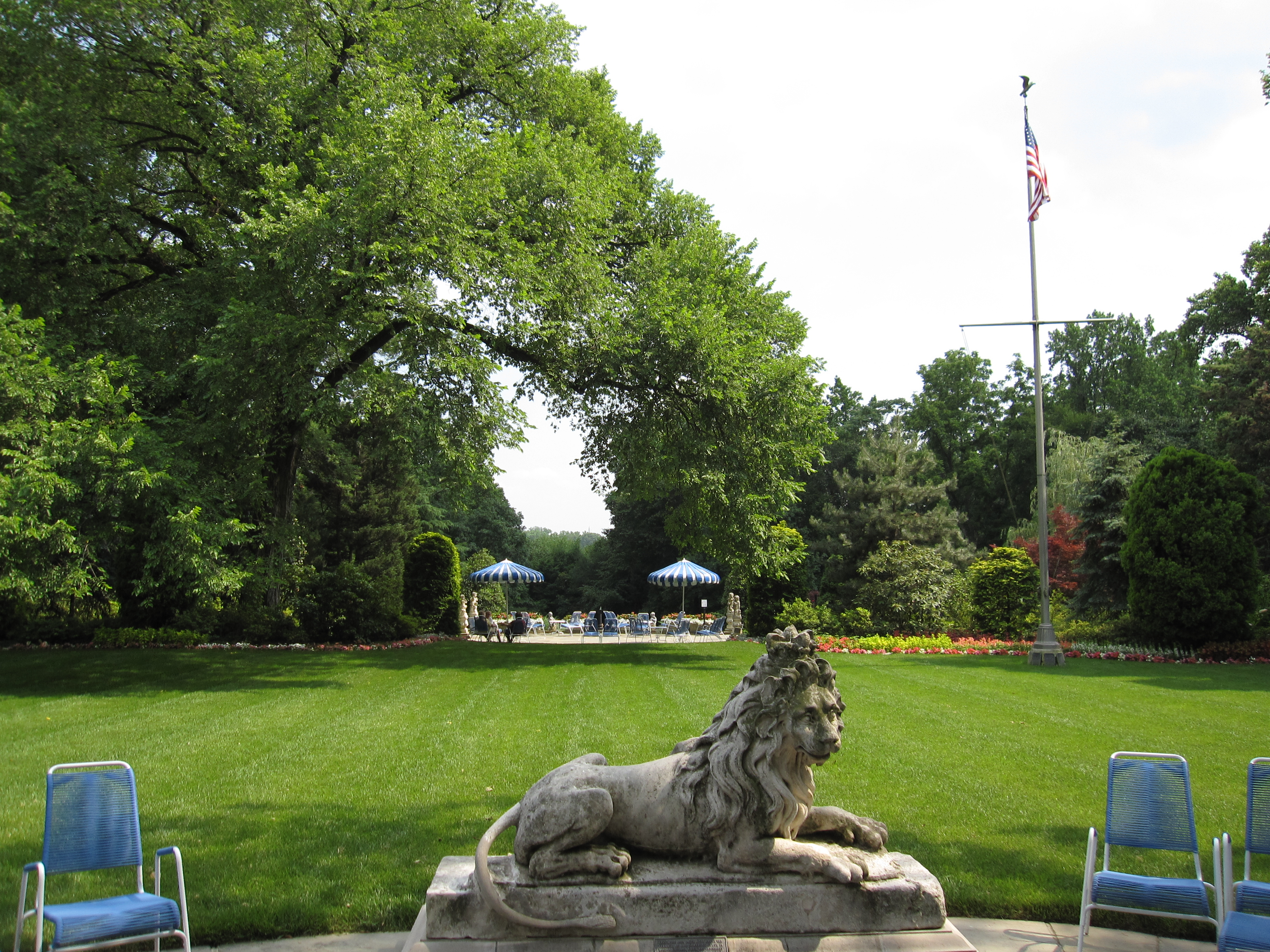
The Lunar Lawn

An additional gift from her friends in 1957, four statues representing the seasons stand in a circular overlook surrounded by trees such as magnolia, cherry, and crape myrtle. Each statue base has a plaque with the names of friends who contributed the gift gardens. The center stone of the walkway features an inscription from a postcard by Alexandra Feodorovna, stating "Friendship outstays the hurrying flight of years and aye abides through laughter and through tears."

=== Lunar lawn ===
Named after its crescent shaped design, the Lunar Lawn served as the scene of parties and special events during warm weather months at Hillwood. Events were hosted for the Boy Scouts of America and the National Symphony Orchestra. The Washington Monument is visible from the lawn, which is framed by American elms. Evergreen, false cypress, azaleas, camellias, dogwoods and magnolia are also found in the Lunar Lawn. Every season the horticulture staff rotates out flowers, a tradition set by Post.

A large statue of a lion, dating from early 18th-century England, rests toward the house. 1960s blue and white lawn furniture is placed on the lawn during warm weather months, adding a modern twist to an often historical seeming outdoor environment. A gold gilt swan fountain is placed on one wall, and satyrs stand near the terrace.

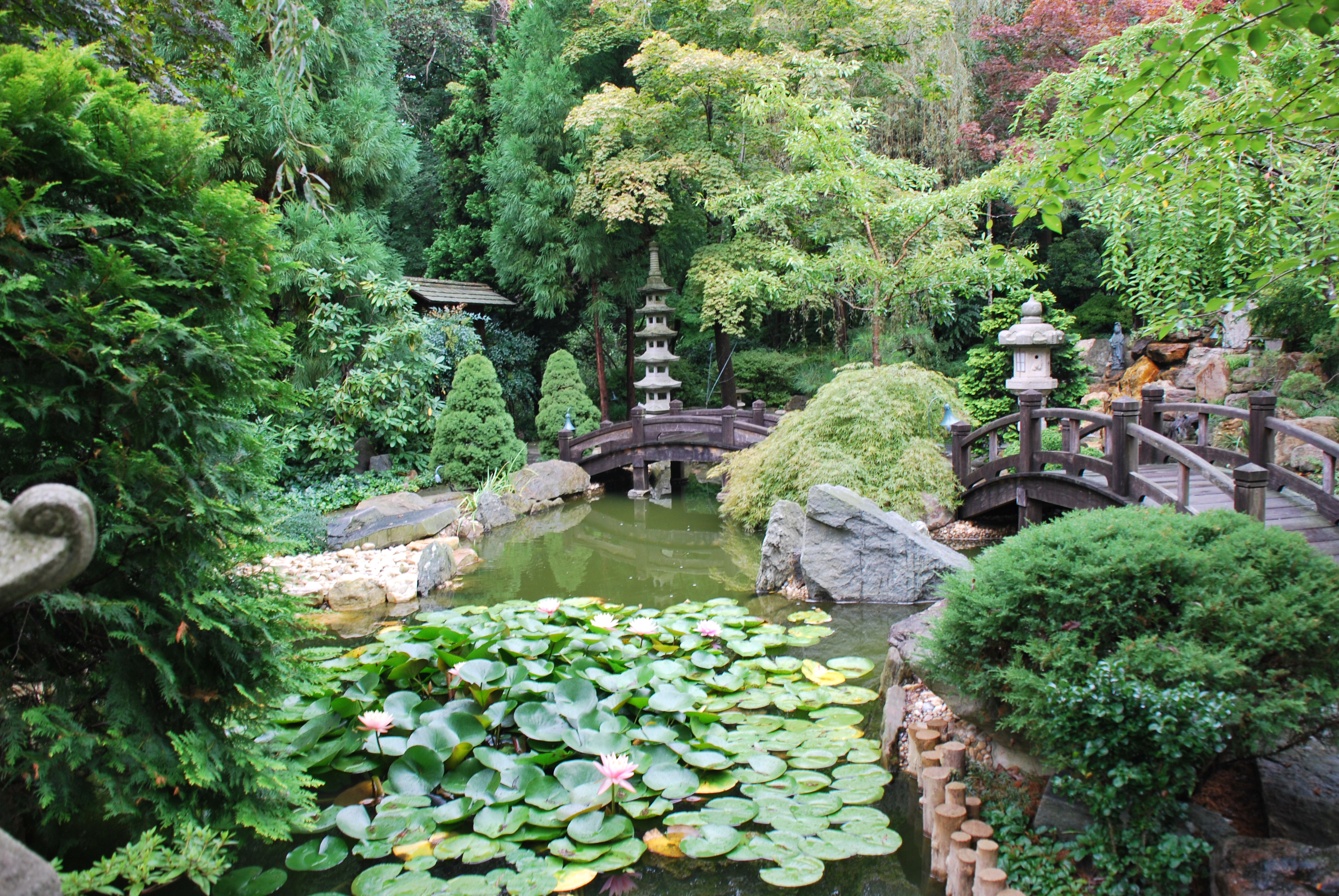
Japanese garden at Hillwood

=== Japanese garden ===
Designed by landscape architect Shogo Myaida in 1957, the Japanese garden was created at Hillwood to emulate a mountain landscape similar to those in Japan. A stream cascades along the hillside and pools appear, with stones placed to provide safe crossing. A figurine of Hotei, a small sculpture of a tortoise and small Tōrōs are found throughout the garden. The garden also combines native and Japanese plants including Japanese pines, Colorado blue spruce, maples, azaleas, and false cypress.

=== Pet cemetery ===
Post lived with numerous pet dogs throughout her lifetime and chose to memorialize them on the Hillwood grounds. Dogtooth violets, sweetbox and groundcover surround limestone memorials of poodles, hounds and spaniels. The last burial that took place in the cemetery was in 1972 for Post's schnauzer Scampi.

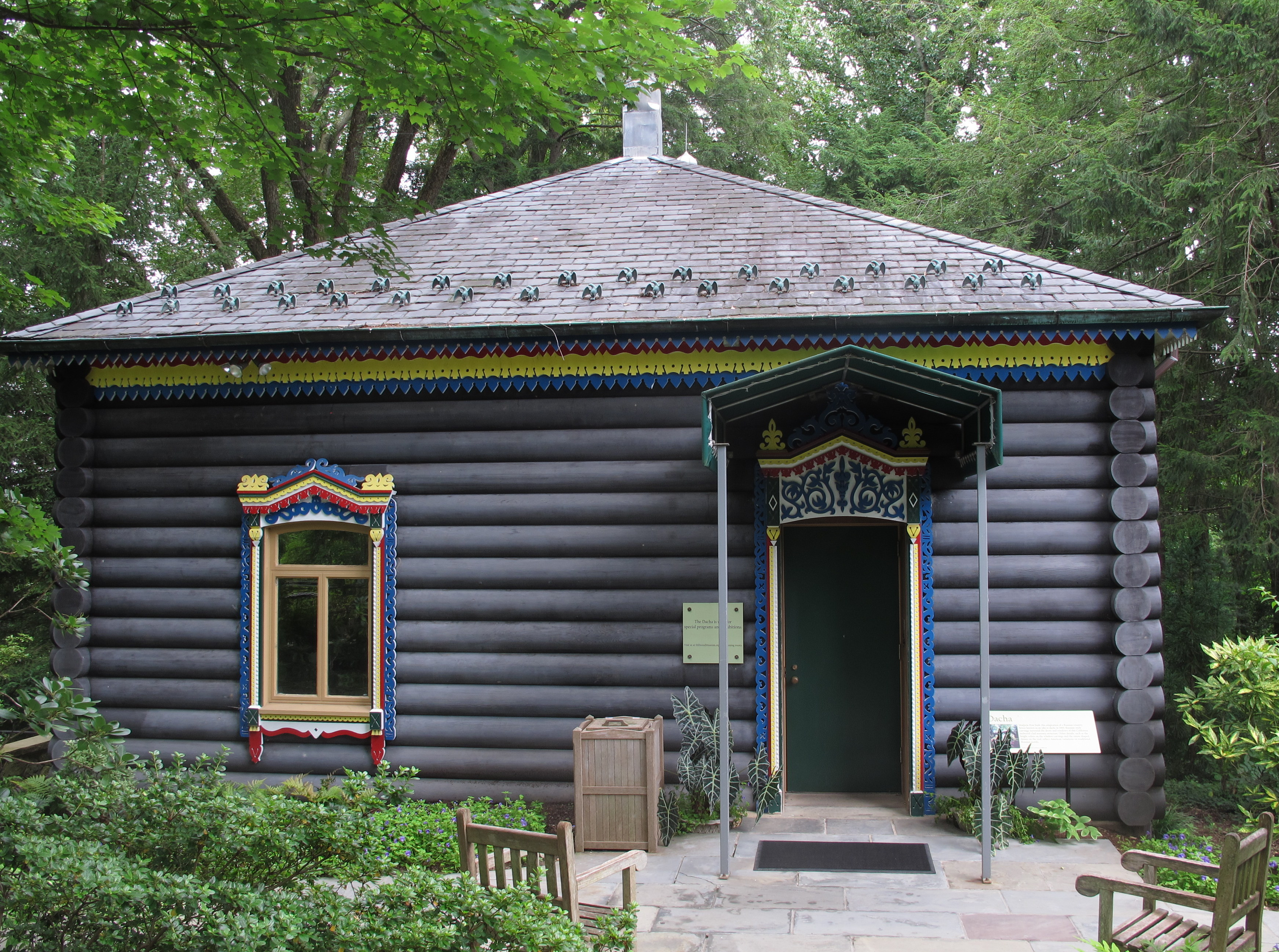
The Dacha at Hillwood

=== Dacha ===
Among the gardens and forest is a dacha built in 1969, representational of pre-Cold War Russian culture. The building features whole-log architecture and detailed carvings around the windows and door. The building houses changing exhibitions.

=== Cutting garden and greenhouse ===
The cutting gardens serve as the Hillwood's main source for fresh flowers, as per Post's desire to have fresh flower arrangements throughout the house and grounds year round. The selection of flowers dates back to the 1950s, while the greenhouse was rebuilt in 1996 and looks as it did when Post was alive. The greenhouse serves as horticulture staff offices, work spaces, and home to Hillwoods famous collection of orchids.

=== Adirondack Building ===
Representative of Post's retreat, Camp Topridge in the Adirondack Mountains, the Adirondack Building, which was built 10 years after Post's death, serves as a museum programming venue.

== Outreach ==
The Hillwood established an advisory committee in 2001 for the LGBTQ community of Washington, D.C. The estate hosts events such as Gay Day, which includes concerts and film nights. Working closely with major events such as Gay Pride and numerous non-profit queer organizations in the region, the Hillwood serves as one of the few cultural institutions reaching out to the LGBT community. In 2007 the estate was awarded the Ally of the Year Award by the D.C. LGBT Chamber of Commerce.
