= Jacqueline Kennedy Garden =

Garden outside the White House in Washington, DC, United States

Coordinates: 38.8975°N 77.0361°W

Jacqueline Kennedy Garden dedication ceremony on 22 April 1965

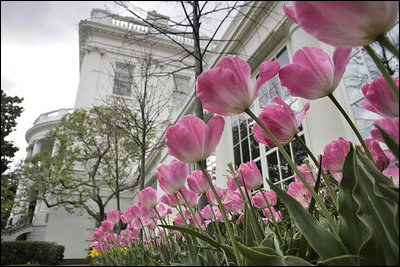
Spring Garden - Pink tulips borders the East Colonnade (2007)

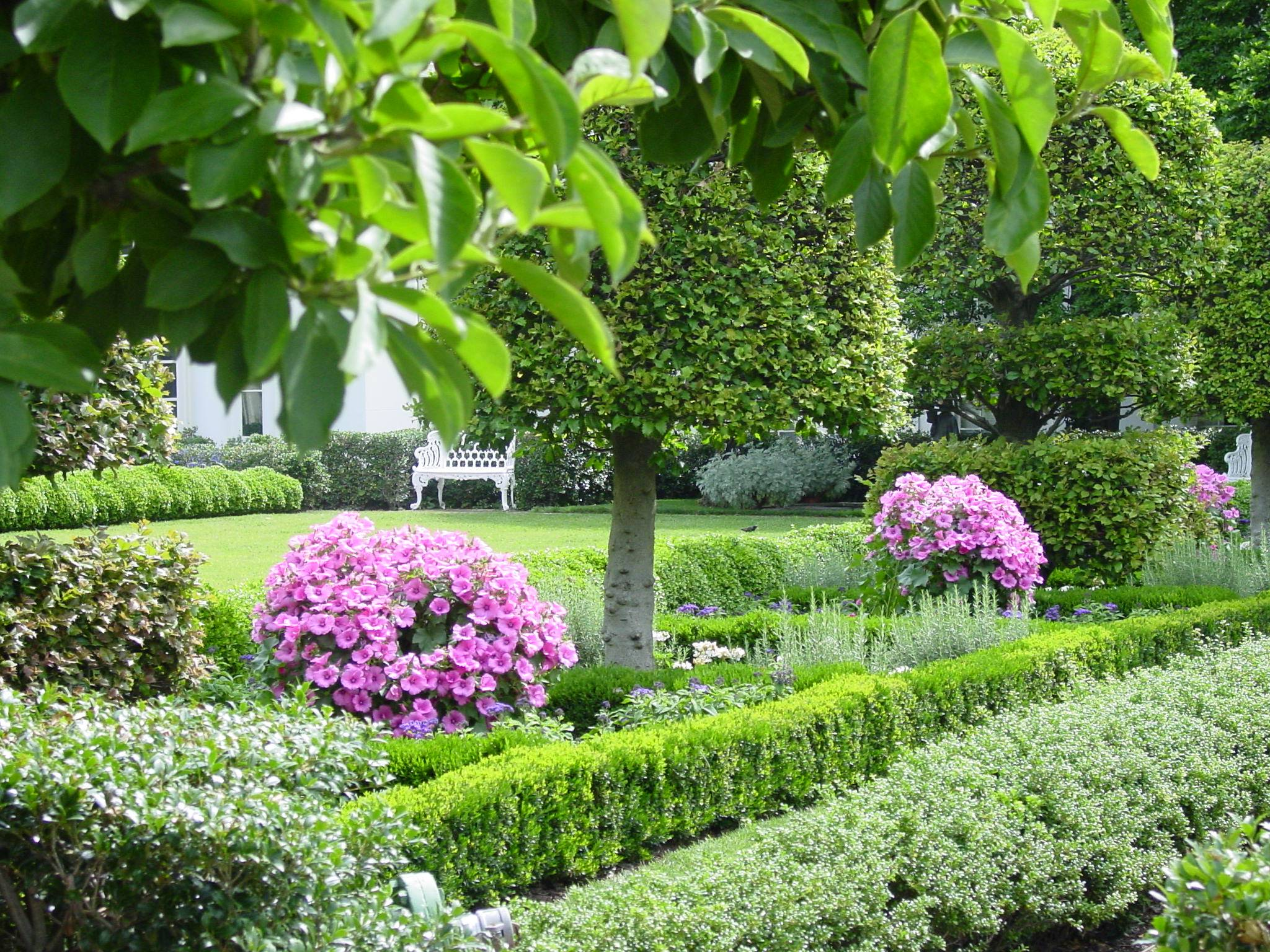
Summer Garden - Magnolia and Littleleaf lindens flanked by ageratum and boxwood with white cast iron Rococo Revival garden bench from 1850 (2007)

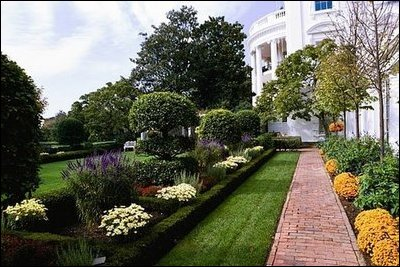
Autumn Garden - Bronze colored chrysanthemum spoon Starlet borders brick walkway (2007)

The Jacqueline Kennedy Garden was located at the White House adjacent south of the East Wing Colonnade. Named for former first lady Jacqueline Kennedy in 1965, the garden was symmetrical to the Rose Garden by the West Wing Colonnade of the Executive Residence. It was removed along with the rest of the original East Wing as part of site preparation for a new East Wing containing the White House State Ballroom, and is being rebuilt alongside the new East Wing.

== History ==
Edith Roosevelt, who had established her "Colonial Garden" on the site of the present Rose Garden, oversaw a similar but less formal planting on the east side, the site of the future Jacqueline Kennedy Garden. The origins of the Garden began in 1913, with First Lady Ellen Axson Wilson calling it the East Garden, which saw Mrs. Wilson's design featuring a modest central lily pond. After the first lady died in 1914, the garden was completed resulting in an 36-by-19-foot (11.0 m × 5.8 m) area called the "East Garden," or the "First Lady's Garden."

In the following nearly half a century, the White House grounds fell into disrepair. When the Kennedy administration came to office, the unkempt state of the gardens caught the focus of First Lady Jacqueline Kennedy, who worked with Rachel Lambert "Bunny" Mellon and Peter Wheeler on the redesign and replanting of the Rose and East Gardens.

At the time of President Kennedy's assassination in November 1963, the Rose Garden had been completed, but the East Garden revitalization was still a work in progress. After his funeral, for which Mellon arranged flowers, First Lady Bird Johnson asked her to resume her work on the White House grounds. Mellon completed her work on the garden in close collaboration with Irvin Williams who, among other responsibilities, was tasked with finding and introducing magnolia trees in the garden. To honor Jacqueline Kennedy's contributions to the White House and its grounds, Lady Bird renamed the East Garden as the "Jacqueline Kennedy Garden" during the 22 April 1965 dedication ceremony.

Like the Rose Garden, the Jacqueline Kennedy Garden was used for events, such as, awards ceremonies and informal entertainment. Both Lady Bird Johnson and Pat Nixon favored use of the garden for parties and teas. First Lady Hillary Clinton exhibited contemporary sculpture in the garden.

=== Demolition and rebuild ===
In October 2025, the Trump administration commenced construction on the White House grounds with site preparations of the East Wing for the ballroom and multi-storied underground security and PEOC military complex. This included landscape removal and the razing of the garden area. Architectural renderings and models show a larger garden after construction is complete. However, exact plans and whether the Kennedy name will be retained were unavailable as of October 2026.

== Design and horticulture ==
Bunny Mellon created a space with a defined central lawn, bordered by flower beds planted in a French style using American botanical specimens. Though more formal than the previous East Garden, the Jacqueline Kennedy Garden paid tribute to Beatrix Farrand's designs in its use of a more organic structure, planting masses of the same plants in drifts, and use of foliage plants like ornamental grasses and caladiums. The garden followed a layout established by Bunny Mellon. Each flower bed was planted with a series of Littleleaf lindens and Kennedy saucer magnolias bordered by low hedges of boxwood and American Holly. The outer edge of the flower bed facing the central lawn was edged with boxwood. Perennial flowering plants included delphinium, hollyhock, lavender, and roses.

Many seasonal flowers were interspersed to add nearly year round color. Spring blooming bulbs planted in the rose garden included jonquil, daffodil, fritillaria, grape hyacinth, tulips, chionodoxa and squill. Summer blooming annuals change yearly. In the fall, chrysanthemum and flowering kale bring color until early winter.
