= Prime Ministers of the Imperial Conference (October 1923) =

1923 painting by Douglas Chandor

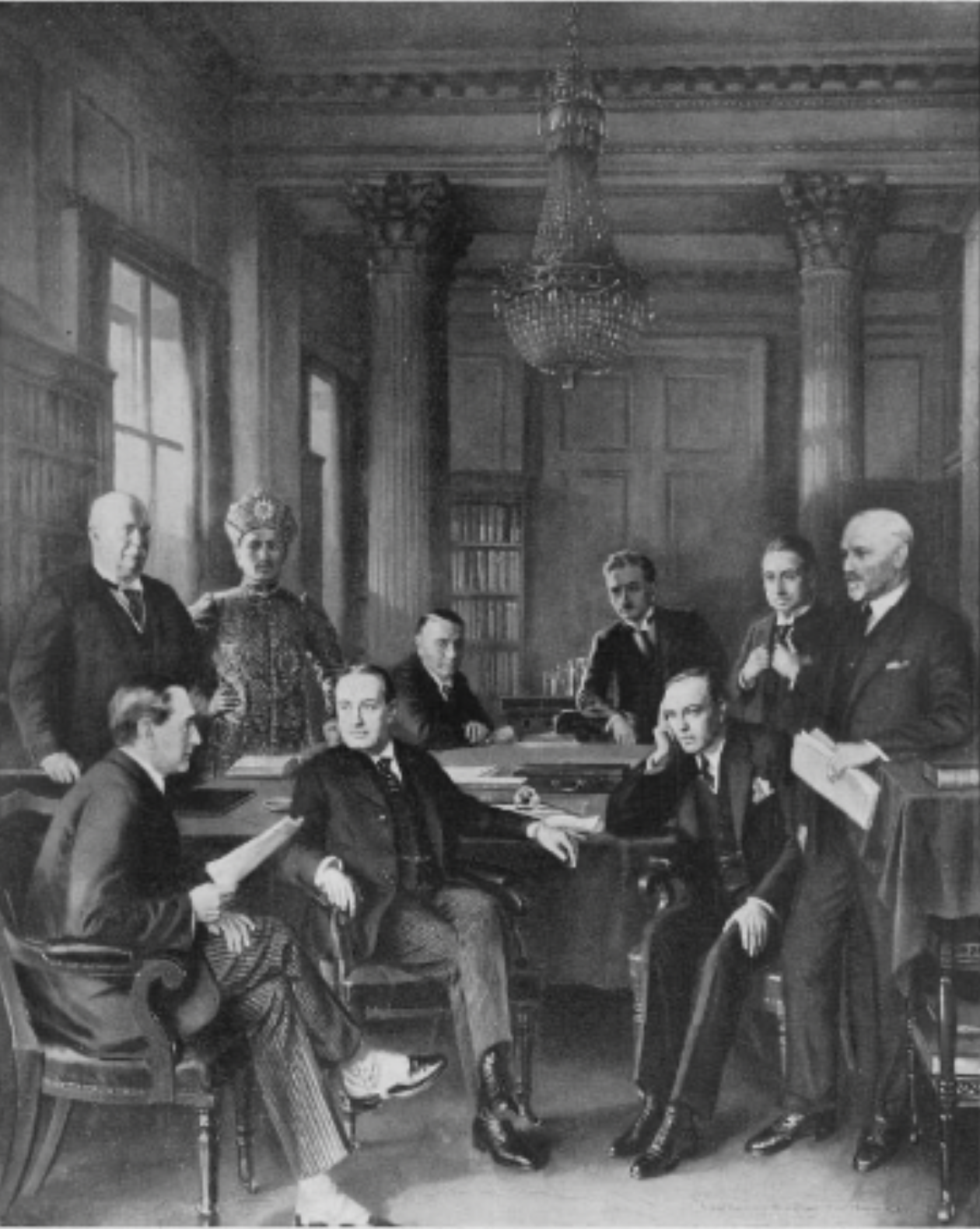
- Artist: Douglas Chandor
- Medium: Oil painting on canvas
- Dimensions: 290 cm × 335 cm (9 ft. 6 in in × 11 ft. 6 in in)

Prime Ministers of the Imperial Conference (October 1923) is an oil on canvas painting by Douglas Chandor. It depicts the leaders present at the 1923 Imperial Conference, held in the conference room at 10 Downing Street, London, in 1923. In 1924, during the British Empire Exhibition, Wembley, it was on display on the staircase going up to the State Apartments.

The painting measures 335cm by 290cm. Each figure either sitting or standing around a table, is life-size and include seated from left to right: Stanley Bruce (Australia), Stanley Baldwin (United Kingdom), and MacKenzie King (Canada). Standing from left to right are William Massey (New Zealand), the Jai Singh Prabhakar (Alwar), Tej Bahadur Sapru (India), W. T. Cosgrave (Ireland), W. R. Warren (Newfoundland), and General Smuts (South Africa).

A reproduction print was produced by Henry Graves. It was presented to the Northampton Corporation after the Australian government declined to keep it for an offer of £5,000.
