= Weatherford Democrat =

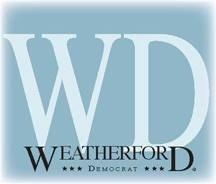
- Type: Daily newspaper
- Format: Broadsheet
- Owner(s): Community Newspaper Holdings Inc.
- Publisher: Jeff Smith
- Editor: James Walker
- Founded: 1895
- Headquarters: 512 Palo Pinto Street, Weatherford, Texas 76086 United States
- Circulation: 1,463 (as of 2023)
- Website: weatherforddemocrat.com

The Weatherford Democrat is a five-day daily newspaper published in Weatherford, Texas, from Tuesday through Saturday. Covering Parker County, Texas, it is owned by Community Newspaper Holdings Inc.

Amid large revenue losses associated with the COVID-19 pandemic, the Mineral Wells Index, a sister CNHI newspaper located about 20 miles away, published its last issue in May 2020 and merged with the Democrat, which plans to cover both areas.
