= Weatherford Downtown Historic District =

Historic district in Texas, United States

- U.S. National Register of Historic Places
- U.S. Historic district
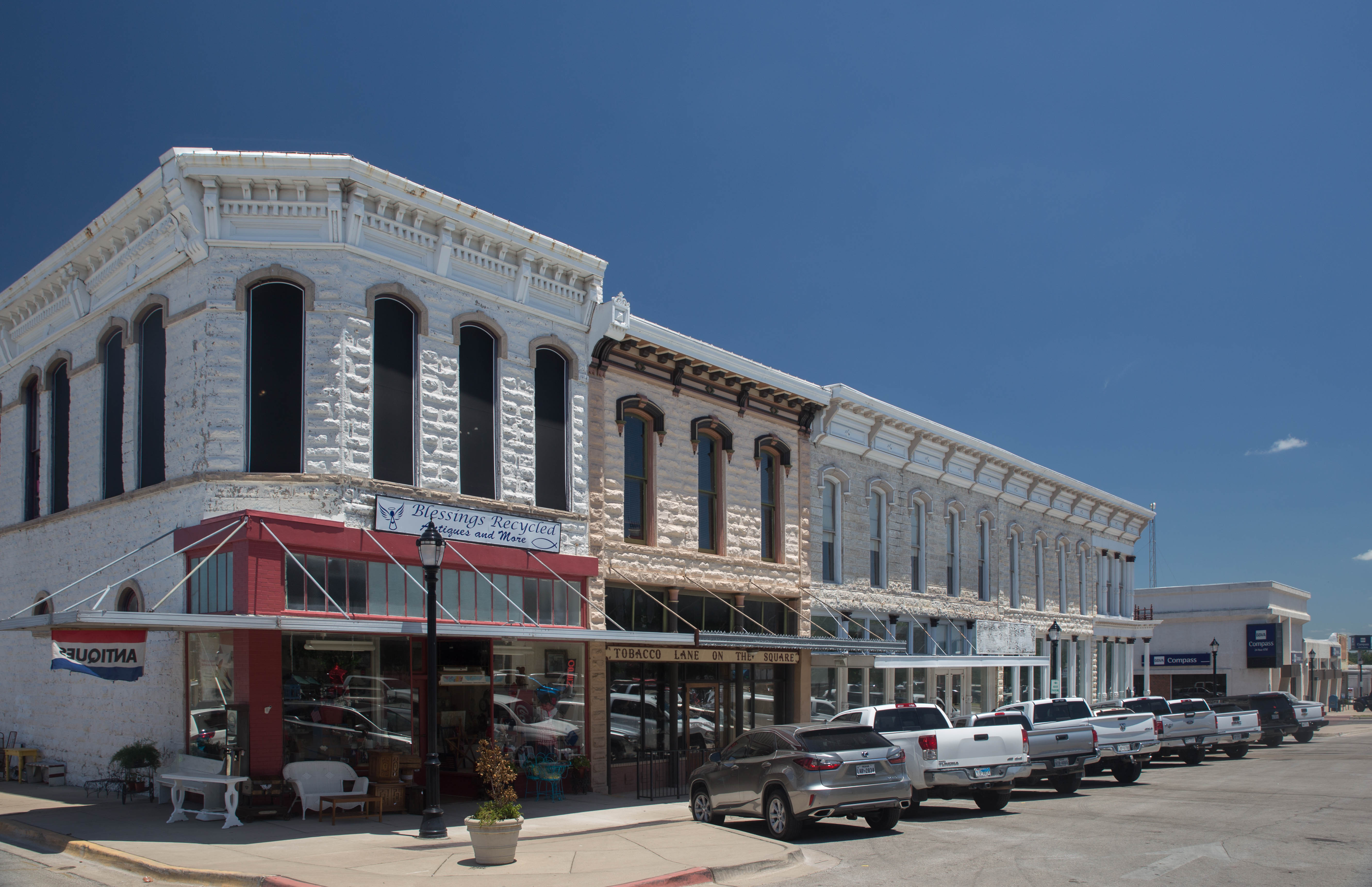

- Location within Texas Location within the United States
- Location: Roughly bounded by Waco, Water, Walnut and Lee Sts., Weatherford, Texas
- Coordinates: 32°45′33″N 97°47′46″W
- Area: 31 acres (13 ha)
- Architect: Multiple
- Architectural style: Chicago, Italianate, Commercial Style
- MPS: Weatherford MPS
- NRHP reference No.: 90001745
- Added to NRHP: November 23, 1990

The Weatherford Downtown Historic District is located in Weatherford, Texas, the seat of Parker County.

The district was added to the National Register of Historic Places on November 23, 1990.

== See also ==
- National Register of Historic Places listings in Parker County, Texas
- Recorded Texas Historic Landmarks in Parker County
