= Parker County Peach Festival =

Annual event in Weatherford, Texas

The Parker County Peach Festival is an annual event held in the open area surrounding the Parker County Courthouse on the second Saturday of each July in Weatherford, Texas, since 1985. In addition to celebrating the peach crop from local growers, the festival also showcases local arts and crafts vendors. Peaches are served at rest stops along a bike rally event called the Peach Pedal. A children's stage is among the three separate stages for entertainment. The festival features a “42” domino tournament.

After paying a sponsorship fee of $5000 and $15,000 for peach-flavored iced coffee in 2023, the Peach Festival refused to allow Unity Recovery to participate as a sponsor when it learned Unity planned to distribute free samples of Narcan along with the iced coffee.
