= John Arthur Chandor =

American businessman and bigamist

- Born: January 18, 1850; New York City, US
- Died: June 1, 1909 (aged 59); London, England
- Occupation: Businessman
- Spouses: Adeline Augusta Dickinson; Elizabeth Fry Ralston; Lucy May Newton
- Children: 10, including Valentine Chandor, Leslie Fry and Douglas Chandor

John Arthur Chandor (January 18, 1850 – June 1, 1909) was an American businessman and bigamist. According to the historian Michael Hagemeister, contemporary sources have called John "an adventurer of the most dangerous character", an "inveterate liar", and a "scoundrel in money matters".

John was born in New York City on January 18, 1850. His father was the inventor and entrepreneur Lasslo Philip Chandor (born László Fülöp Sándor) (1815/1817 – October 7, 1894), an Austro-Hungarian immigrant to the US in the 1840s, who by the mid-1860s had become a successful municipal lighting contractor and businessman in St Petersburg, Russia.

On April 1, 1874, John married Adeline Augusta Dickinson (1850–1947) in New York City, and they had six children:

- Valentine Laura Chandor (1875–1935)
- Jack Arthur Feucheres Chandor (1876–1935)
- Alice Marie (Mary) Chandor (1880–1956), married George Edward Dickinson (1863–1938)
- Harold Alvin Chandor (1882–1952)
- Reginald Mortimer Chandor (1884–1936)
- Roland Giles Chandor (1886–1903)

In December 1875, John met Elizabeth "Lizzie" Fry Ralston (nee Red) (1837–1929), the widow of San Francisco businessman and financier William Chapman Ralston (1826–1875), on a ship travelling from New York City to Europe. Although he claimed to be single, in reality John already had a wife (A. A. Dickinson, in New York City). About 5 years after they had first met, John and Elizabeth had one child, Louise A. Chandor (1882–1970), who was born in Paris, France, where John was employed at the time as a minor U. S. diplomat (in 1882 he held the position of Second Secretary at the U. S. Embassy in Paris). Louise married Captain Feodor Ivanovich Shishmarev (1876-1917) (of the Czarist Russian Imperial Army) in 1906 in St. Petersburg, Russia, and subsequently she was usually referred to by her married name: Paquita Louise de Shishmareff. After emigrating from Russia to the United States in 1917 with her 2 sons - Kyril (1907-1975) and Misha (Michael) (1910-1983) - Paquita became an antisemitic, pro-fascist author who wrote articles and books under the pen name L. Fry (Leslie Fry).

In the 1870s and 1880s, John lived in Paris, with his wife Adeline and with Elizabeth, on the proceeds of investments from his father's career.

John's third "wife" was Lucy May Newton (1867–1912), and they had three children:

- Violet May Chandor (1886–1916)
- Colonel Hugo Henry Chandor OBE (1895–1966), married Daphne Rachel Mulholland (previously married to Esme Bligh, 9th Earl of Darnley)
- Douglas Granville Chandor (1897–1953), a famous portrait painter, and garden designer.

John Arthur Chandor died in Kensington, London, England on June 1, 1909.
