= Perry Hunt Wheeler =

American architect

- Born: October 5, 1913; Cordele, Georgia
- Died: 1989 (aged 75–76)
- Education: Emory College
- Alma mater: BFA, University of Georgia, 1937; graduate degree, landscape architecture, Harvard University, 1938
- Occupation: Landscape architect
- Known for: Garden projects in Washington, D.C., including the White House Rose Garden
- Awards: American Horticultural Society Landscape Design Award, 1977 Garden Advisory Committee at Dumbarton Oaks, 1964-1974; Award of Merit from the University of Georgia

Perry Hunt Wheeler (5 October 1913 – 1989) was an American landscape architect who is primarily known for several garden projects in Washington, D.C., including the White House Rose Garden. He was born in Cordele, Georgia to John L. and Sarah Wheeler. He began his post-secondary education at Emory College, but soon transferred to the University of Georgia where he earned a Bachelor of Fine Arts in 1937. He went on to earn a graduate degree in landscape architecture in 1938 from Harvard University.

Wheeler moved to Georgetown in the District of Columbia after World War II and began practicing by designing private gardens for the District's high society clientele. He specialized in low-maintenance gardens that consisted of water features, ornamental shrubbery, and detailed hardscapes.

In addition to working with Rachel "Bunny" Mellon on the official design of the Rose Garden, Wheeler worked on projects such as the National Arboretum Asian Garden pagoda, several gardens of the Hillwood Estate, Museum & Gardens, and the Washington National Cathedral Bishop's Garden.

The American Horticultural Society presented Wheeler with an AHS Landscape Design Award in 1977. Other honors included serving on the Garden Advisory Committee at Dumbarton Oaks from 1964 to 1974 and an Award of Merit from the University of Georgia.

Wheeler died of cancer in Virginia, at the age of 76.

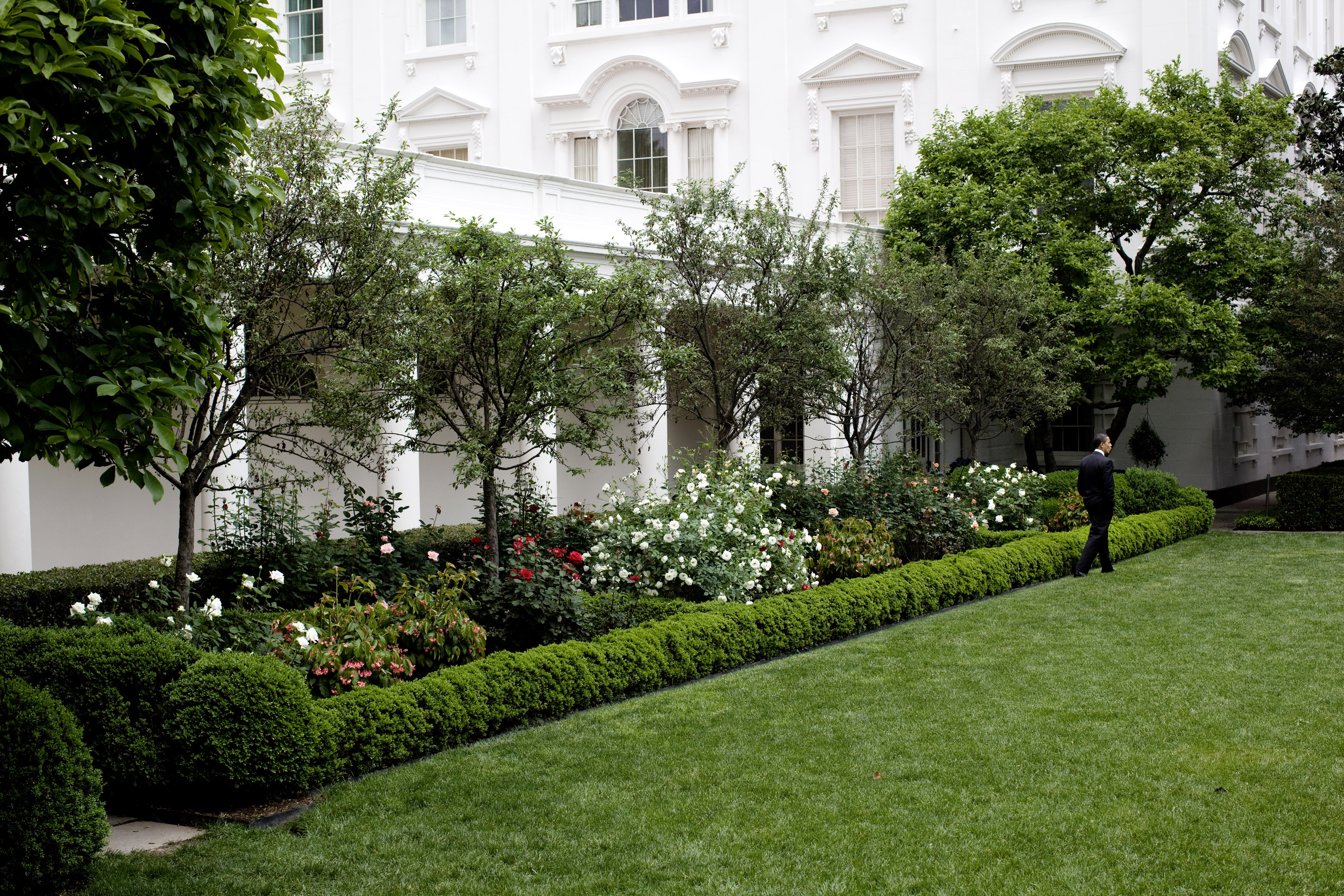
Perry Wheeler designed the White House Rose Garden with Mrs. Rachel "Bunny" Mellon.

== Published articles ==
- Home and Garden, 1953, “The Bride’s First Garden: A Five Year Plan”
- The American Garden, 1951, "Three Purpose Garden"
