= Mineral Well Park =

- U.S. National Register of Historic Places
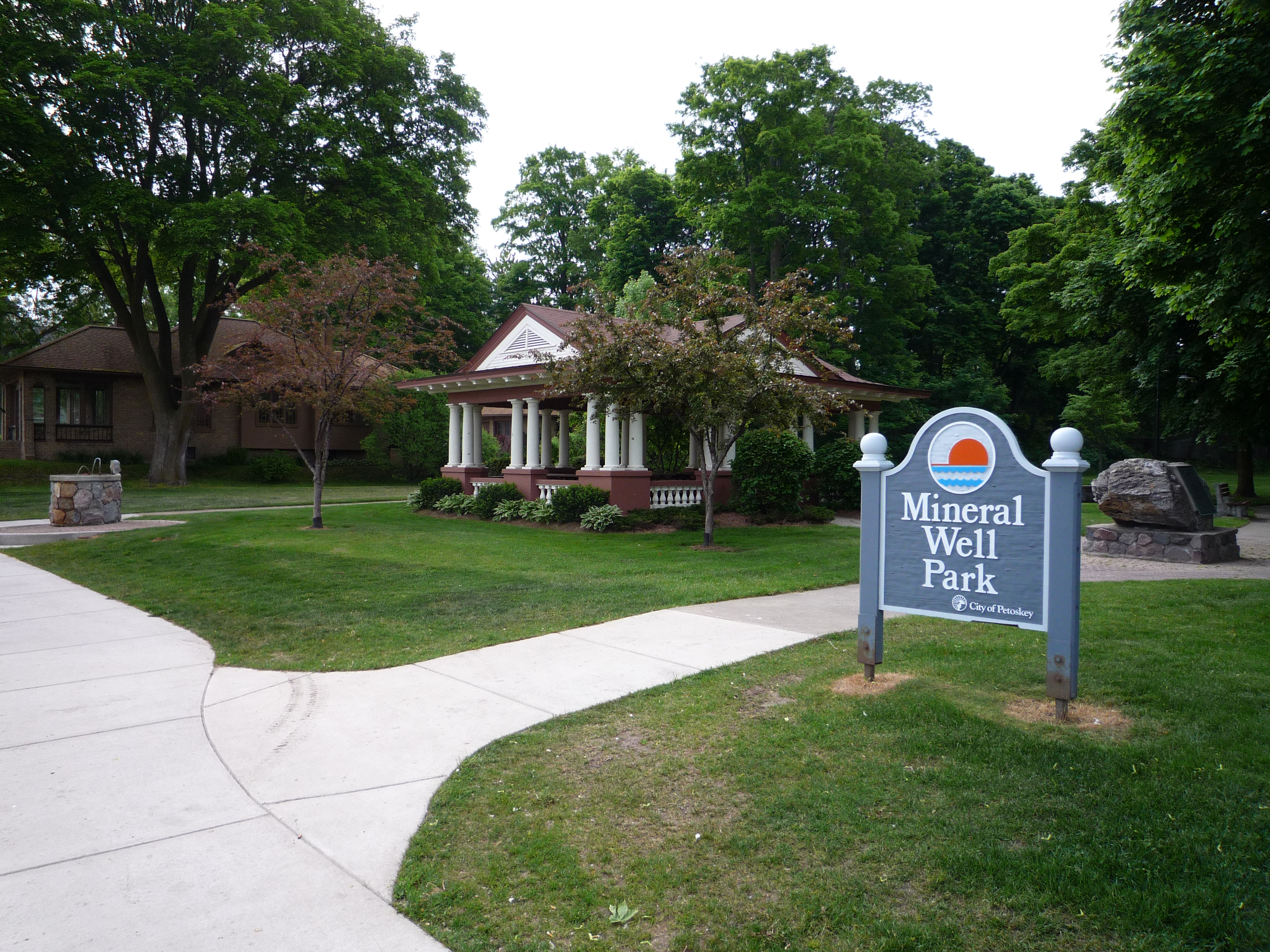

- Location within Michigan Location within the United States
- Interactive map
- Location: W. Lake St., Petoskey, Michigan
- Coordinates: 45°22′31″N 84°57′37″W
- Area: 2 acres (0.81 ha)
- Built: 1915
- Architect: C. H. Hansen
- Architectural style: Classical Revival
- MPS: Petoskey MRA
- NRHP reference No.: 86002036
- Added to NRHP: March 25, 1987

Mineral Well Park is a park located on the east side of the Bear River at West Lake Street in Petoskey, Michigan. It was added to the National Register of Historic Places in 1987.

== History ==
In 1888, mineral waters were discovered in Petoskey. Two years later, Frank S. Kedzie of Michigan Agricultural College (now Michigan State University) declared that Petoskey's waters were the best in the state for bathing and drinking. Capitalizing on the appeal of the waters, a bathhouse and pavilion were constructed on this site, under a lease from the city of Petoskey. There is no visible trace of these 19th-century structures at the site, but foundations may remain underground.

The lease ended in 1908, and in 1914-16 the city redeveloped the park with a series of improvements, many donated by the Federation of Women's Clubs of Petoskey and other private individuals. These improvements included a fish pond, concrete paths, and benches. Also included was the 1915 park pavilion designed by local architect C. H. Hansen. The fish pond has been filled in, but the majority of the other improvements made in 1914-16 remain in the park.

== Description ==
Mineral Well Park is a two-acre section located on the east side of the Bear River, and running from the West Mitchell Street Bridge north to West Lake Street. The park is a level section of grassland with a few large trees and shrubs. It contains cement pathways leading to the park pavilion. Grouped around the pavilion are the low, capped, cylindrical, fieldstone wells from which the park takes its name, and a retaining wall surrounding the former fish pond, which contains a bronze fountain in its center. The fish pond has been filled in and now contains plantings.

The pavilion, designed by C. H. Hansen, is a single-story, open air, cross-gable-roof structure. Concrete urn balustrades encircle the pavilion, and link podia topped with short Tuscan columns. The columns support the entablature and roof.
