= Mineral Wells Index =

Daily newspaper in Mineral Wells, Texas

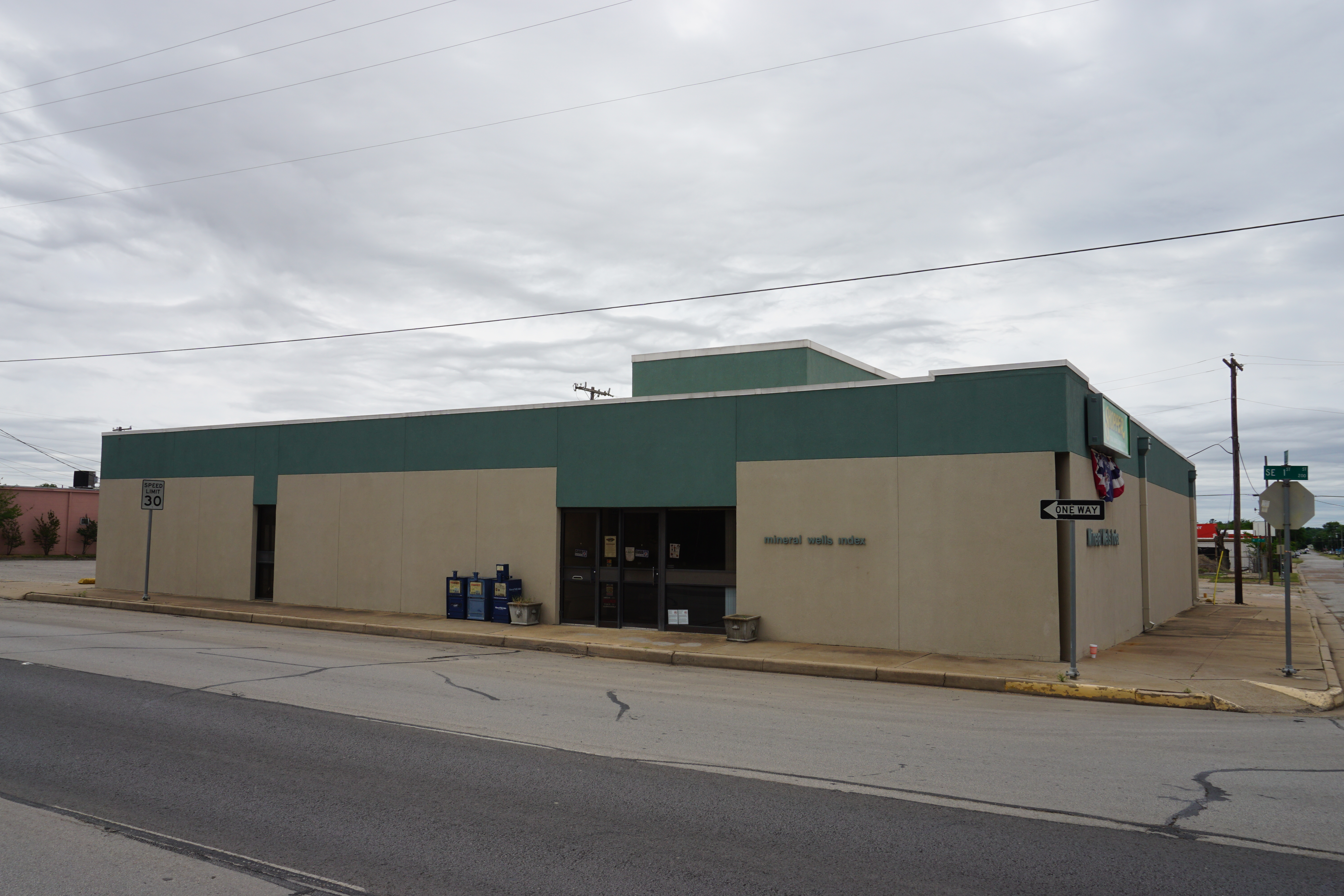
- The Mineral Wells Index building
- Type: Twice-weekly newspaper
- Format: Broadsheet
- Owner(s): Community Newspaper Holdings Inc.
- Founded: May 5, 1900
- Ceased publication: May 23, 2020
- Headquarters: 300 Southeast First Street; Mineral Wells, Texas 76067; United States
- Circulation: 3,119 daily
- Website: mineralwellsindex.com

The Mineral Wells Index was a daily newspaper published in Mineral Wells, Texas, on weekday afternoons and Sunday mornings. The Index coverage area included Palo Pinto County, Texas. It is owned by Community Newspaper Holdings Inc.

Amid large revenue losses associated with the COVID-19 pandemic, it published its last issue in May 2020 and merged with sister CNHI newspaper Weatherford Democrat, located about 20 miles away.
