= Leslie Fry =

American author (1882–1970)

- Born: Louise A. Chandor; February 16, 1882; Paris, France
- Died: July 15, 1970 (aged 88); Fullerton, California, US
- Occupation: Author
- Known for: Writing Waters Flowing Eastward, an antisemitic novel
- Father: John Arthur Chandor

Leslie Fry (February 16, 1882 – July 15, 1970), sometimes referred to as L. Fry, was the pen name of Paquita Louise de Shishmareff (born Louise A. Chandor). (Note: Her name at death was given as Paquita Deshishmaref in the Social Security Death Index (SSDI).) She was an American antisemitic, pro-fascist author, who is primarily known for Waters Flowing Eastward (1931), a book which asserts that Jews were to blame for both capitalism and Bolshevism, and that it was primarily certain Jews who started World War I. She alleged that certain Freemasons were involved as well. She postulated that the ultimate aim of these particular Jews and Freemasons was "World Domination". These conclusions were based in part on her study of the Protocols of the Elders of Zion.

Called "the most active fascist in southern California", Fry was also a paid Nazi agent who worked to cultivate Nazism in the United States. She attempted to unify various American fascist movements.

== Family background ==
Louise A. Chandor was born in Paris, France, the daughter of U.S. citizens John Arthur Chandor and Elizabeth (Red) Fry Ralston.

Louise's mother, Elizabeth (Red) Fry, married William Chapman Ralston (1826–1875) on May 20, 1858, in San Francisco. Soon after their marriage, Ralston rose to become a San Francisco banking and real estate magnate. He became a living legend, acclaimed as "the man who built San Francisco." However, the marriage was unhappy, and ended in tragedy on August 27, 1875, when Ralston drowned while swimming in San Francisco Bay. After a preliminary, partial settlement of her husband's estate, Elizabeth Ralston embarked in December 1875 on a steamer to Europe, intending to settle in Paris with her children. It is reported that she first met John Arthur Chandor en route, and that he soon joined her in Paris, even though he had been recently married in New York City. It is not known if Chandor and Elizabeth Ralston married, but their friendship resulted in the birth of Louise A. Chandor (pen-name: Leslie Fry) in Paris on February 16, 1882.

Louise's paternal grandparents were Lasslo (Laslo) Philip Chandor (originally: László Fülöp Sándor; 1815/1817 – October 7, 1894) and Laura Mannabourg (September 28, 1827 – April 14, 1878). Lasslo was an Austrian-Hungarian adventurer, inventor and businessman who had emigrated to the U.S. in the 1840s. As a founder and director of the Mineral Lighting Company in New York City, and inventor holding several patents, Lasslo had a keen interest in improving city lighting systems. In the early-to-mid 1860s he obtained four lucrative contracts to improve the public lighting of St. Petersburg, Russia. It is reported that the profits from the contracts, and the profits from his inventions used to fulfill them, made Lasslo a millionaire. Lasslo obtained the contracts by cultivating business relationships with U.S. diplomats in the administrations of Presidents James Buchanan, Abraham Lincoln, and Andrew Johnson, who were involved in U.S.-Russia trade relations during this time. During the 1870s and 1880s, Lasslo was involved in the burgeoning oil and gas industries in Russia. Lasslo's son John Arthur Chandor (1850–1909), who was Louise's father, was also involved in various business activities in Russia.

== Early life in Europe and Russia, 1882–1917 ==
Louise spent considerable time living in St. Petersburg while her grandfather and father were engaged in business activities there. On May 26, 1906 (Old Style) in St. Petersburg, Louise married Captain (later Colonel) Feodor Ivanovich Shishmarev (born August 16, 1876, O.S.), an officer in the Russian Imperial Army. The Shishmarev family had been a Russian noble family for centuries. It is believed that Feodor was murdered in 1917 by Bolsheviks during the Russian Revolution, but before his murder he had the foresight to send Louise (who was now using her married name 'Paquita Louise de Shishmareff') with their two sons (Kyril(l) and Misha). and the family fortune, out of the country to safety. During the Bolshevik Revolution, Paquita and her sons moved to Tiflis, in the Transcaucasian SFSR, where they lived under the protection of the American consulate.

== Activities in the United States and Europe, 1917–1970 ==
In the mid-summer of 1917, Paquita and her sons left Tiflis and traveled to the eastern Russian port city of Vladivostok, where they boarded the steamship S. S. Goentoer bound for San Francisco, California. They arrived August 31.

According to the 1920 U. S. Federal Census records, in 1920 Paquita and her son Misha (Michael) (listed under the surname "Deshishmareft" in the records) were living in Mamaroneck (Westchester County), New York, while her son Kyril (listed as "Keera De Shismareff" in the records) was attending Mount Tamalpais Military Academy (in San Rafael, Marin County, California). It is believed that Paquita moved back to California about 1926. She was associated with fascist political circles during this period. Her wealth allowed her to financially support right-wing nationalists.

Paquita met Henry Ford in or around 1920, and presented him with a copy of the Protocols of the Elders of Zion. She conceived the Protocols as part of a conspiracy according to which a group led by the "cultural Zionist" Asher Ginzberg plotted world domination. However, at the time Ginzberg merely supported an international Jewish cultural and political revival, not the planning and formation of an actual Jewish state.

Antisemitic writer and Nazi ideologist Ernst Graf zu Reventlow named Fry as his source for his own view that Ginzberg was the author of the Protocols. After Philip Graves provided evidence in The Times of London that the Protocols were in reality a composite document which, for the most part, had been constructed/plagiarised from a variety of other writings which had been published previously to the appearance of the Protocols, Reventlow published his support for Fry's theory in the periodical La Vieille France. Ginzberg's supporters sued Reventlow, who was forced to retract his allegations and pay damages.

Strongly opposed to Roosevelt's New Deal, Fry argued that it represented "the transformation of the Constitutional form of American government into that of the Kahal, or Jewish form of government. It has been called the New Deal and the Jew Deal. Both are correct and synonymous."

Fry was involved in various fascist organisations of the 1930s, and founded the nationalist and isolationist Christian Free Press, "an anti-Semitic newspaper modeled after Germany's infamous Der Sturmer". She joined forces with Henry Douglas Allen (1879–1961) in a failed attempt to revitalize the Ku Klux Klan. She also made failed attempts to unify American fascist movements. Documents found by San Diego police in Allen's briefcase in 1938 implicated Fry as a paid Nazi agent, but she escaped prosecution at the time. However, she later became estranged from Allen and accused him of misappropriating money from her.

In 1940, Fry fled to fascist Italy, but returned the U.S. after the attack on Pearl Harbor. In 1943, she was indicted for sedition as part of the Great Sedition Trial, albeit the charges were dropped due to a lack of evidence. However, Fry, who'd been interned on Ellis Island upon her return to the United States, remained in custody until the end of the war.

== Origin of the "Protocols" according to Waters Flowing Eastward ==
Fry's major work, Waters Flowing Eastward (1931), attempted to prove that the Protocols were part of a plot to destroy Christian civilization. The apparent conflict between Communism and Capitalism was a smoke-screen for Jewish domination, as outlined in the Protocols. The claim repeated by many authors that the Protocols first came to light in 1884 via Justine Glinka, was originally put forth by Fry in the 1st edition (1931) of Waters Flowing Eastward, in a chapter of the book titled "How the Protocols Came to Russia".

According to Fry's account, Justine Glinka (1836–1916), the daughter of Russian diplomat Dmitry Glinka (1808–1883), was endeavouring (in the early to mid-1880s) to serve her country (Russia) by obtaining political information in Paris, which she forwarded to General Orgevskii. In 1884 a Jewish Freemason named Joseph Schorst (alias of Théodore Joseph Schapiro) sold Justine a manuscript copy of the Protocols (written in French) for 2,500 francs. Fry believed that Schorst had smuggled this copy of the Protocols out of the archives of one of the Mizraïm Masonic Lodges in Paris. According to records in the archives of the Sûreté (French Secret Police), Schorst eventually fled to Egypt, where he was murdered. This manuscript of the Protocols then supposedly found its way (through a very convoluted and questionable route) into the hands of Sergei Nilus, who was the first person to publish it in its entirety (in 1905) under a single cover.

== Occult Theocrasy ==
Fry and her close friend Edith Starr Miller, Lady Queenborough) spent about 10 years (1922–1931) as the leaders of a secretive international research group which they named the "International League for Historical Research". The purpose of this group was to identify (and clarify the interconnections between) the most important secret societies existing at that time in Europe, the United States, and in the Middle East. They detailed their findings in Occult Theocrasy (2 vols.) (Chatou, France: British American Press, 1931–1933), a work whose publication was completed shortly after Edith's death. This work is now widely regarded as a "conspiracy classic." Occult Theocrasy summarizes what was known at that time about the organizations and secret societies which collectively form what is now referred to, variously, as the Cabal, the Illuminati, the One World Government, the Secret World Government, or the New World Order. Although Occult Theocrasy is not an authoritative work in the strict sense – some sections of it are vastly more informative and candid than others – nevertheless, as a whole, the work was more comprehensive, up-to-date, and revealing in its subject-matter than any other similar work available in the English language at that time. The work contains overt antisemitic elements and attributes much of world history to a conspiracy of Jews. It gives credence to the infamous Protocols of the Elders of Zion, and has two chapters that express praise for the mission of the Ku Klux Klan. To its credit, most of the source information for Occult Theocrasy is listed in the book's bibliography. The work also features a brief occult glossary, and a detailed index.

== Politico-Occult-Judaeo-Masonry Chart ==
Fry compiled an elaborate chart called the Politico-Occult-Judaeo-Masonry Chart (1940, by L. Fry), This presents a summary (in chart form) of all the most important information which was published in Occult Theocrasy. This chart attempts to display the interconnections between all the organizations which Fry and Lady Queenborough claim were/are involved in the alleged Jewish masterplan for world domination. The chart consists of a sheet of paper (measuring approximately 23" X 18"), printed on both sides. On the chart Fry illustrates how the Jewish masterplan is linked to various Judaic, Masonic, Occult, and World-Political organizations, such as the Bavarian Order of the Illuminati, founded by Adam Weishaupt (1748–1830) on May 1, 1776, and the League of Nations.

== See also ==
- Denis Fahey
- Fyodor Viktorovich Vinberg
