= Valentine Chandor =

American educator (1875–1935)

- Born: Valentine Laura Chandor; February 14, 1875; New York City, US
- Died: October 25, 1935 (aged 60)
- Occupation(s): Educator and headmistress (principal)
- Employer(s): (Charlton School) Lincoln School; Chandor School; Spence School
- Parent(s): John Arthur Chandor (father) and Adeline Augusta Dickinson (mother)

Valentine Laura Chandor (February 14, 1875 – October 25, 1935) was an American educator.

She was born in New York City, the eldest child of John Arthur Chandor and Adeline Augusta Dickinson (May 3, 1850 –September 18, 1947), who were married on April 1, 1874 in Manhattan, New York City.

Chandor taught at the Charlton School in New York City, which the Rockefeller Foundation purchased in 1917, and turned into Lincoln School. After Charlton parents persuaded her, Chandor up on her own with 40 girls at East 62nd Street, the Chandor School. The pupil roll grew to 100 girls, chosen "for character and breeding sooner than wealth", and in 1932, Chandor described by Time magazine as "able proprietress of the foremost remaining small school for New York fashionables" agreed to become head of Spence School, merging its 176 pupil roll with her own.

According to Time magazine, after Chandor's death in autumn 1935, Spence School was "again heading up", and she was succeeded as headmistress by Miss Dorothy Brockway.
