= Chandor Gardens =

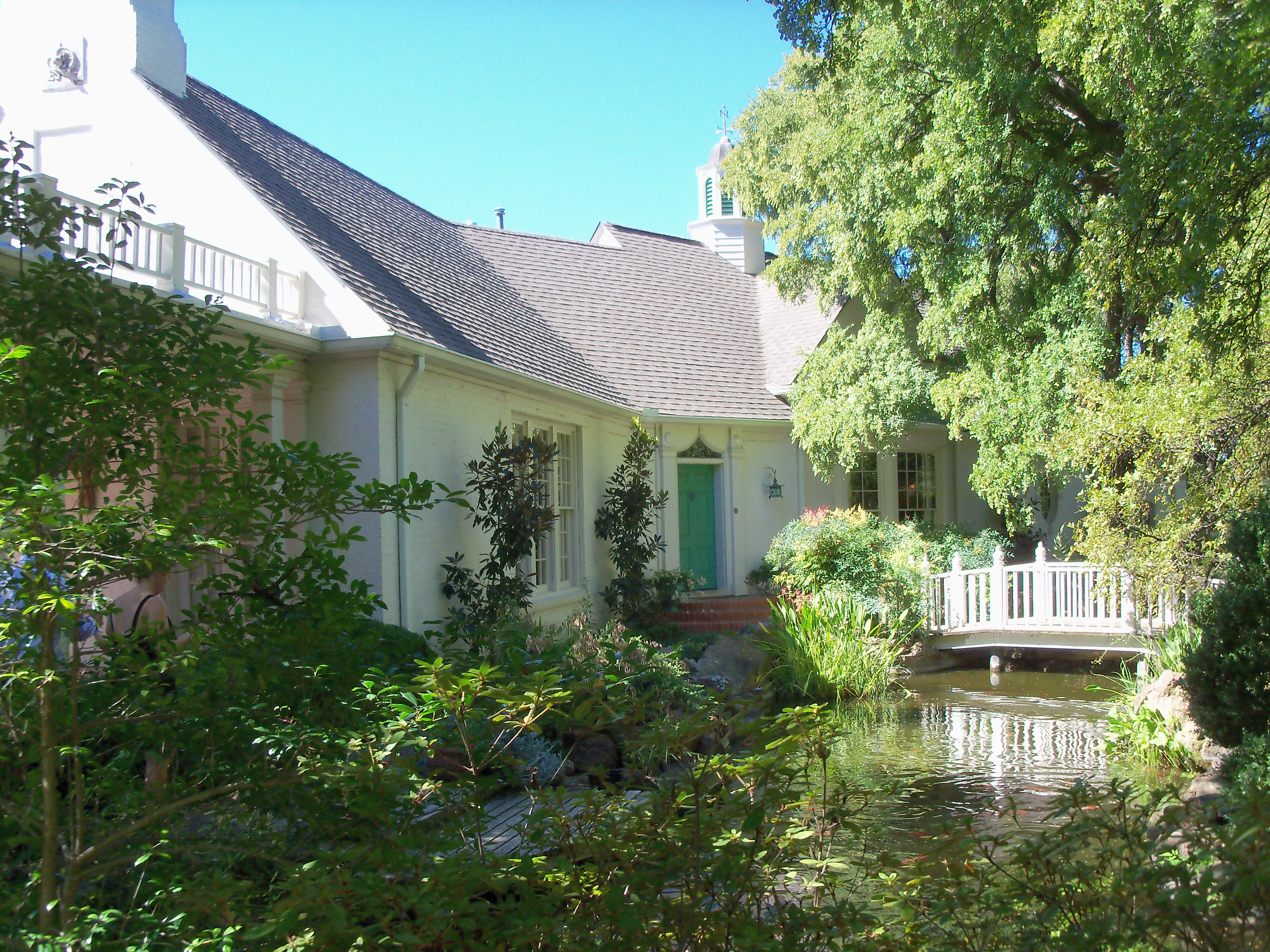
Chandor Gardens house looking NW across koi pond, 2010

Chandor Gardens is a historic 3.5 acres (1.4 hectares) garden established in Weatherford, Texas, US, by the British-born portrait painter Douglas Chandor (1897–1953) in 1936. Originally named White Shadows, it was renamed by his widow Ina Kuteman after his death in 1953, and kept open to the public until her death in 1978.

The gardens were neglected until 1994, when Melody and Chuck Bradford bought them and spent a year cleaning and repairing the gardens and Chandor's house and studio, and began hosting weddings and garden tours. In 2002, the City of Weatherford acquired Chandor Gardens.

The gardens are a Recorded Texas Historic Landmark.
