= Weatherford, Texas =

City in the United States

- City
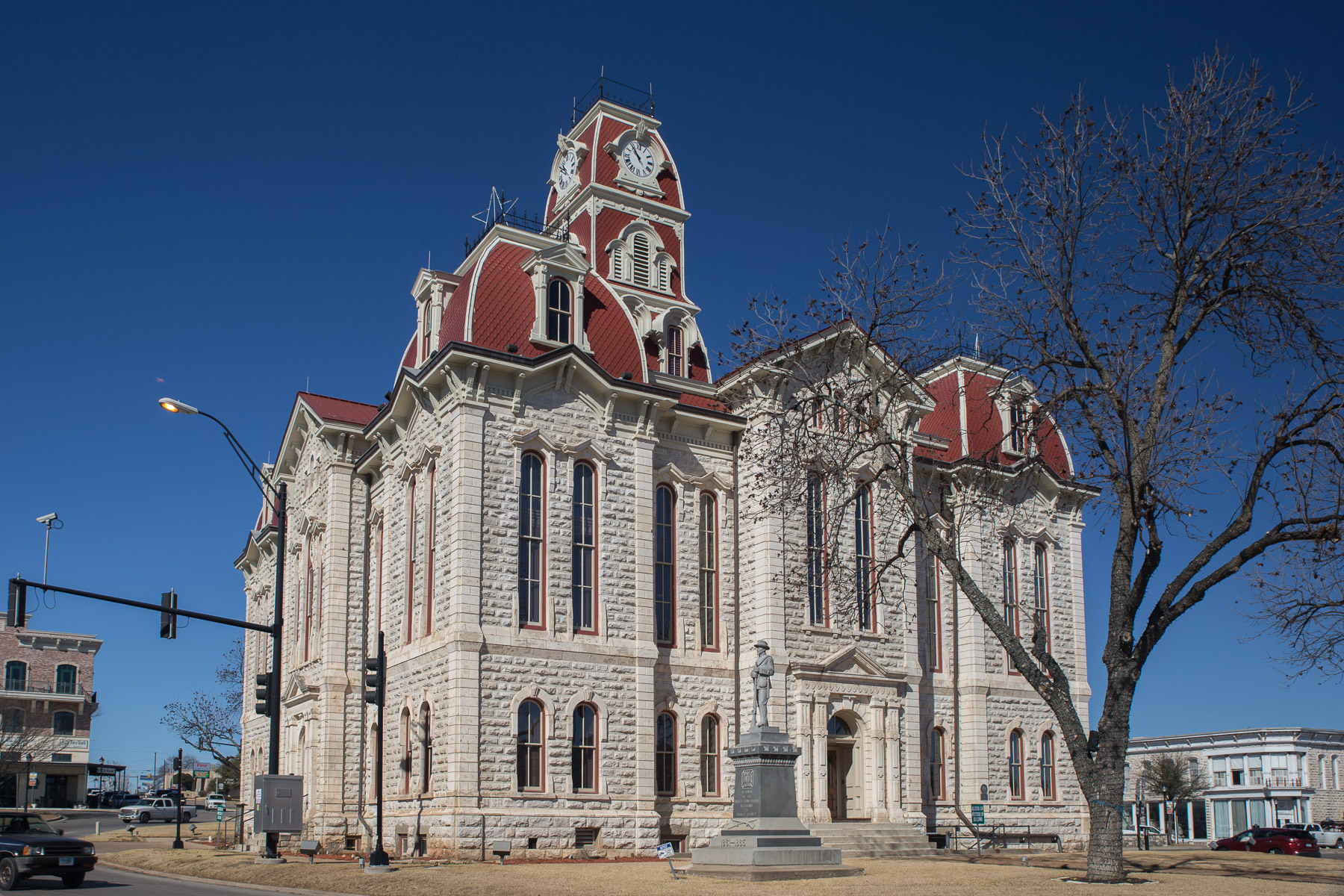
- Parker County Courthouse, February 2022

- Logo
- Nicknames: Cutting Horse Capital of the World, Peach Capital of Texas
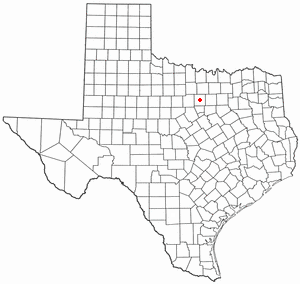
- Location of Weatherford within Parker County, Texas.
- Coordinates: 32°45′33″N 97°47′6″W
- Country: United States
- State: Texas
- County: Parker

Government
  - Type: Council-manager

Area
  - Total: 28.94 sq mi (74.95 km^{2})
  - Land: 27.12 sq mi (70.24 km^{2})
  - Water: 1.82 sq mi (4.72 km^{2})
- Elevation: 1,053 ft (321 m)

Population (2020)
  - Total: 30,854
  - Density: 1,138/sq mi (439.3/km^{2})
- Time zone: UTC-6 (CST)
  - Summer (DST): UTC-5 (CDT)
- ZIP codes: 76085-76088
- Area codes: 817, 682
- FIPS code: 48-76864
- GNIS feature ID: 2412199
- Website: www.weatherfordtx.gov

Weatherford (/ˈwɛðərfərd/) is a city in and the county seat of Parker County, Texas, United States. In 2020, its population was 30,854. Weatherford is named after Thomas J. Weatherford, a state senator and advocate for Texas's secession to the Confederate States during the American Civil War.

== History ==
=== Beginnings ===
In 1854, Methodist minister Pleasant Tackett led 15 pioneer families into a land they called "Goshen," which would later become part of Parker County, itself to be created the following year by the efforts of State Representative Isaac Parker and State Senator Thomas Jefferson Weatherford in the Texas State Legislature. (Note: Parker was the uncle of Cynthia Ann Parker, a little girl who was stolen from her home by Comanche during the Texas Revolution. Cynthia Ann lived among the Comanche and became the mother of Chief Quanah Parker. Later, when she was overtaken in flight with an Indian raiding party, Isaac Parker recognized her as his long-lost niece. Thomas Jefferson Weatherford, from Dallas, is alleged by his cousin to have never set foot in the town.) Evidence of a prior, failed attempt to colonize the region can be found in the abandoned cabin from 1852-53 located 6 miles (10 km) south of modern Weatherford on the J.H. Voorhies farm. In 1856

The railroad arrived in June 1880. The Santa Fe Depot (which houses the Weatherford Chamber of Commerce) was built in 1908 under Jim Crow laws, with waiting rooms segregated and separated by the ticket office.

== Geography ==
Weatherford is located 25 miles (40 km) west of Fort Worth on Interstate 20. It is the county seat for Parker County.

According to the United States Census Bureau, the city has a total area of 22.7 square miles (59 km^{2}) of which 1.8 square miles (4.7 km^{2}) (7.86%) are covered by water.

=== Climate ===
The climate in this area is characterized by relatively high temperatures and evenly distributed precipitation throughout the year. The Köppen climate classification describes the weather as humid subtropical, Cfa on weather maps.

Climate data for Weatherford, Texas (1991–2020 normals, extremes 1902–present)
Month	Jan	Feb	Mar	Apr	May	Jun	Jul	Aug	Sep	Oct	Nov	Dec	Year
Record high °F (°C)	90 (32)	95 (35)	97 (36)	99 (37)	105 (41)	116 (47)	110 (43)	114 (46)	109 (43)	105 (41)	92 (33)	87 (31)	116 (47)
Mean maximum °F (°C)	76.9 (24.9)	80.5 (26.9)	86.0 (30.0)	89.7 (32.1)	92.9 (33.8)	96.7 (35.9)	101.4 (38.6)	101.8 (38.8)	97.4 (36.3)	90.9 (32.7)	82.5 (28.1)	76.9 (24.9)	103.3 (39.6)
Mean daily maximum °F (°C)	56.2 (13.4)	60.0 (15.6)	67.9 (19.9)	75.8 (24.3)	82.4 (28.0)	90.0 (32.2)	94.6 (34.8)	94.7 (34.8)	87.7 (30.9)	77.8 (25.4)	66.2 (19.0)	57.9 (14.4)	75.9 (24.4)
Daily mean °F (°C)	44.0 (6.7)	47.8 (8.8)	55.7 (13.2)	63.6 (17.6)	71.8 (22.1)	79.7 (26.5)	83.7 (28.7)	83.3 (28.5)	75.8 (24.3)	65.1 (18.4)	54.3 (12.4)	45.8 (7.7)	64.2 (17.9)
Mean daily minimum °F (°C)	31.8 (−0.1)	35.5 (1.9)	43.5 (6.4)	51.4 (10.8)	61.2 (16.2)	69.4 (20.8)	72.9 (22.7)	72.0 (22.2)	64.0 (17.8)	52.5 (11.4)	42.4 (5.8)	33.7 (0.9)	52.5 (11.4)
Mean minimum °F (°C)	15.7 (−9.1)	19.5 (−6.9)	23.9 (−4.5)	33.6 (0.9)	43.3 (6.3)	57.9 (14.4)	64.1 (17.8)	61.7 (16.5)	48.1 (8.9)	35.0 (1.7)	24.6 (−4.1)	18.6 (−7.4)	12.8 (−10.7)
Record low °F (°C)	−4 (−20)	−3 (−19)	7 (−14)	24 (−4)	32 (0)	47 (8)	54 (12)	52 (11)	34 (1)	19 (−7)	13 (−11)	−10 (−23)	−10 (−23)
Average precipitation inches (mm)	1.96 (50)	2.55 (65)	3.03 (77)	2.69 (68)	4.42 (112)	3.93 (100)	1.86 (47)	2.59 (66)	3.19 (81)	3.76 (96)	2.95 (75)	2.25 (57)	35.18 (894)
Average precipitation days (≥ 0.01 in)	5.7	6.3	7.1	6.0	7.8	5.9	4.3	5.0	5.0	5.9	5.4	6.1	70.5
Source: NOAA

== Demographics ==
Historical population
Census	Pop.	Note	%±
1880	2,046		—
1890	3,369		64.7%
1900	4,786		42.1%
1910	5,074		6.0%
1920	6,203		22.3%
1930	4,912		−20.8%
1940	5,924		20.6%
1950	8,093		36.6%
1960	9,759		20.6%
1970	11,750		20.4%
1980	12,049		2.5%
1990	14,804		22.9%
2000	19,000		28.3%
2010	25,250		32.9%
2020	30,854		22.2%
2023 (est.)	38,109		23.5%
U.S. Decennial Census; 2020

=== Racial and ethnic composition ===
Weatherford city, Texas – Racial and ethnic composition (NH = Non-Hispanic) (Note: Note: the US Census treats Hispanic/Latino as an ethnic category. This table excludes Latinos from the racial categories and assigns them to a separate category. Hispanics/Latinos can be of any race.)
Race	Pop 2010	Pop 2020	% 2010	% 2020
White (NH)	20,494	23,757	81.18%	77.0%
Black or African American (NH)	576	599	2.28%	1.94%
Native American or Alaska Native (NH)	150	177	0.59%	0.57%
Asian (NH)	222	321	0.88%	1.04%
Pacific Islander (NH)	13	24	0.05%	0.08%
Some Other Race (NH)	8	93	0.03%	0.3%
Multiracial (NH)	350	1,385	1.38%	4.49%
Hispanic or Latino	3,437	4,498	13.61%	14.58%
Total	25,250	30,854	100.00%	100.00%

=== 2020 census ===
As of the 2020 census, Weatherford had a population of 30,854, 11,989 households, and 7,643 families. The median age was 37.8 years; 23.2% of residents were under 18 and 19.4% were 65 or older. The female/male ratio was 1:0.915 overall and 1:0.879 for those 18 and over.

About 96.9% of the residents lived in urban areas, while 3.1% lived in rural areas.

Of the 11,989 households in Weatherford, 31.5% had children under 18 living in them, 48.9% were married-couple households, 16.4% were households with a male householder and no spouse or partner present, and 29.2% were households with a female householder and no spouse or partner present. About 28.8% of all households were made up of individuals, and 13.8% had someone living alone who was 65 or older.

The city had 12,935 housing units, of which 7.3% were vacant. The homeowner vacancy rate was 2.4% and the rental vacancy rate was 7.1%.

Racial composition as of the 2020 census
Race	Number	Percentage
White	24,989	81.0%
Black or African American	633	2.1%
American Indian and Alaska Native	263	0.9%
Asian	326	1.1%
Native Hawaiian and other Pacific Islander	25	0.1%
Some other race	1,542	5.0%
Two or more races	3,076	10.0%
Hispanic or Latino (of any race)	4,498	14.6%

== Arts and culture ==
Weatherford is within the Bible Belt.

The Weatherford area is a large peach producer, and was named "Peach Capital of Texas" by the Texas Legislature. The peach is celebrated each year at the Parker County Peach Festival, which is Weatherford's largest event and one of the best-attended festivals in Texas.

Weatherford has been described as the "cutting horse capital of the world".

The headquarters of the National Snaffle Bit Association, an equestrian organization, is located in Weatherford.

=== Historic buildings ===
Several homes of the Queen Anne and Victorian styles were built at the turn of the 20th century; some are open for tours, arranged by the Parker County Heritage Society. The Parker County Courthouse is of the Second Empire style.

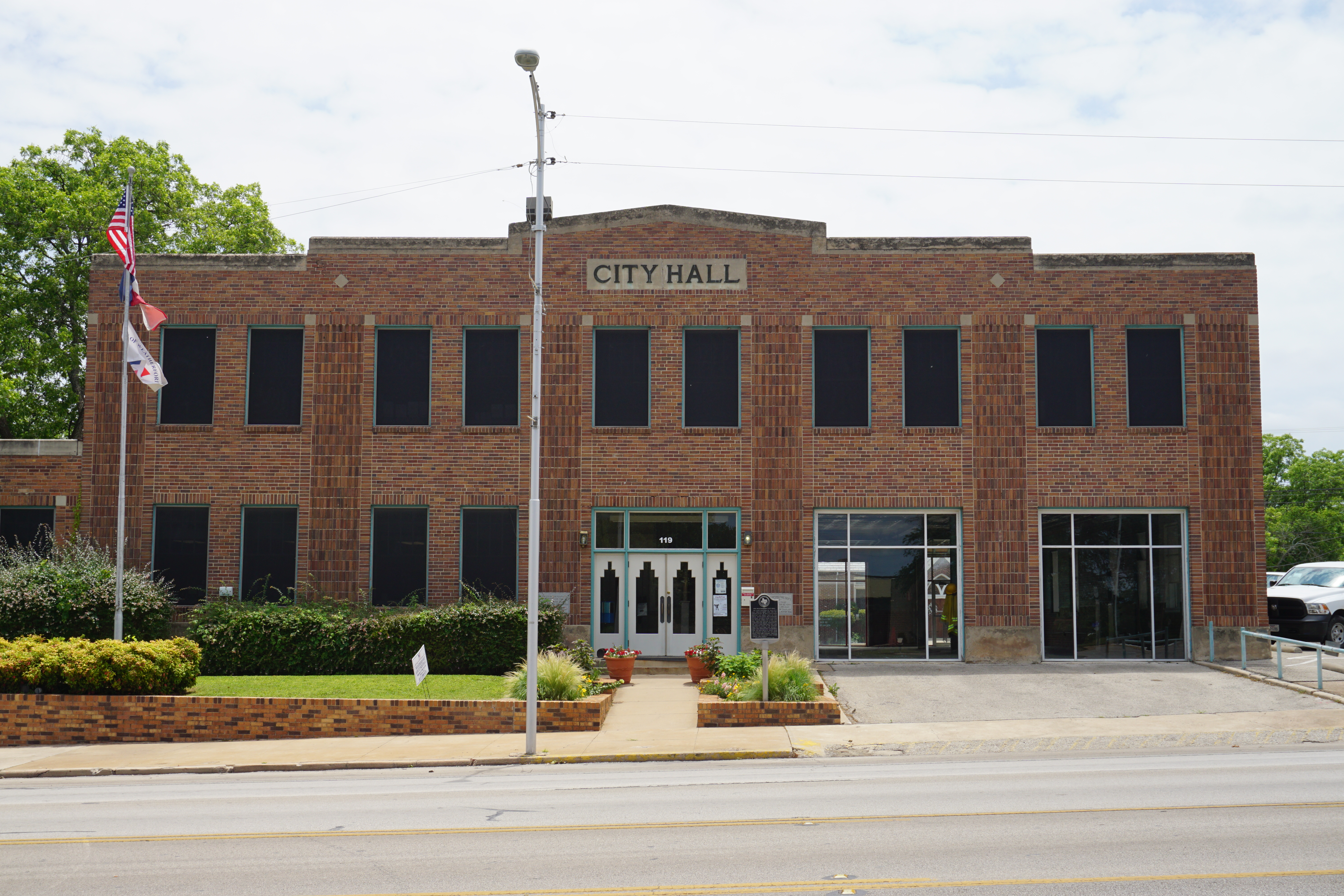
Old City Hall

== Education ==
Weatherford is served by the Weatherford Independent School District.

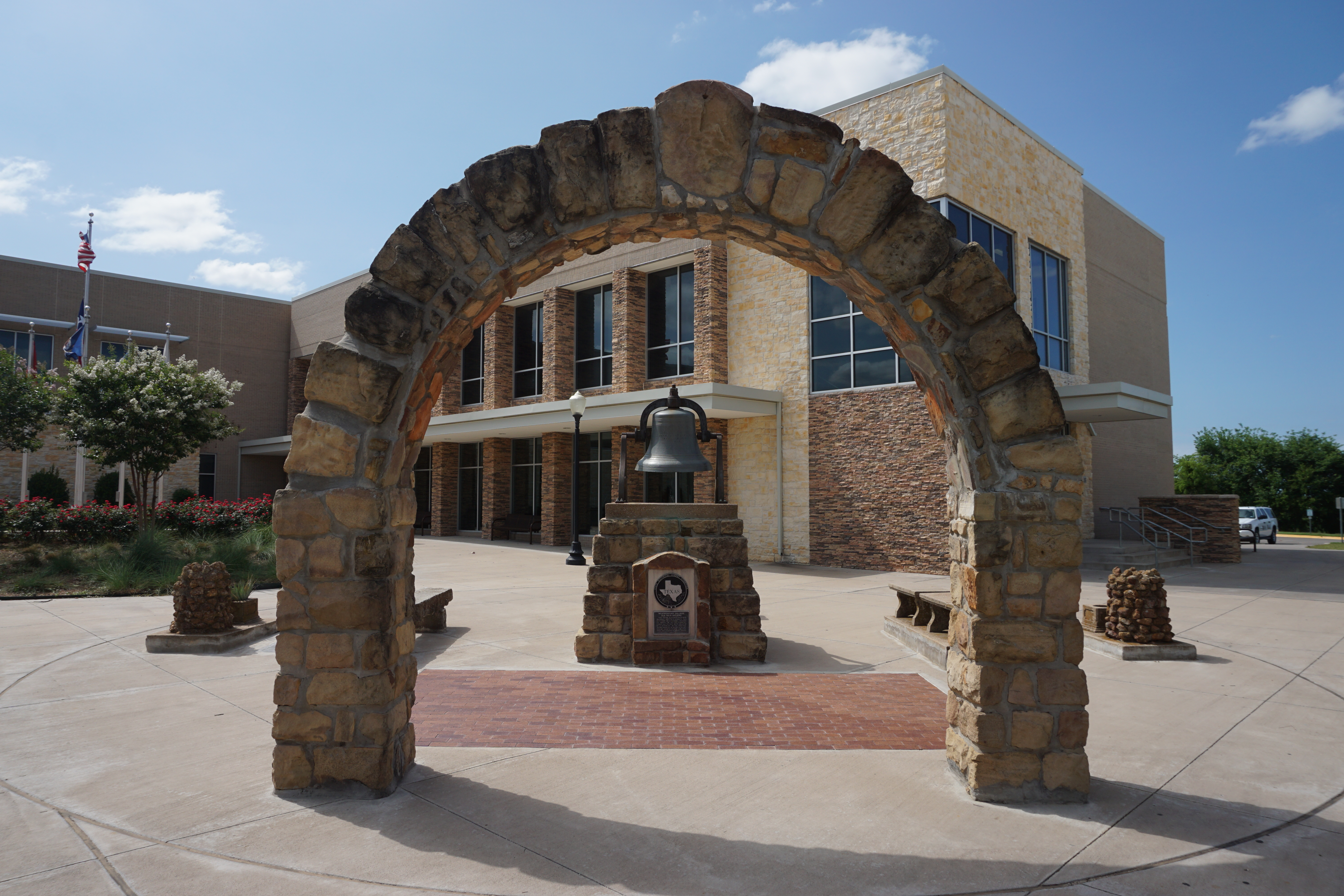
Roy and Jeanne Grogan Historic Plaza at Weatherford College

Weatherford College is a 150-year-old community college, with more than 35 study areas and 19 professional/technical programs. The college was originally built by Masons and was one of the first in Texas.

== Media ==
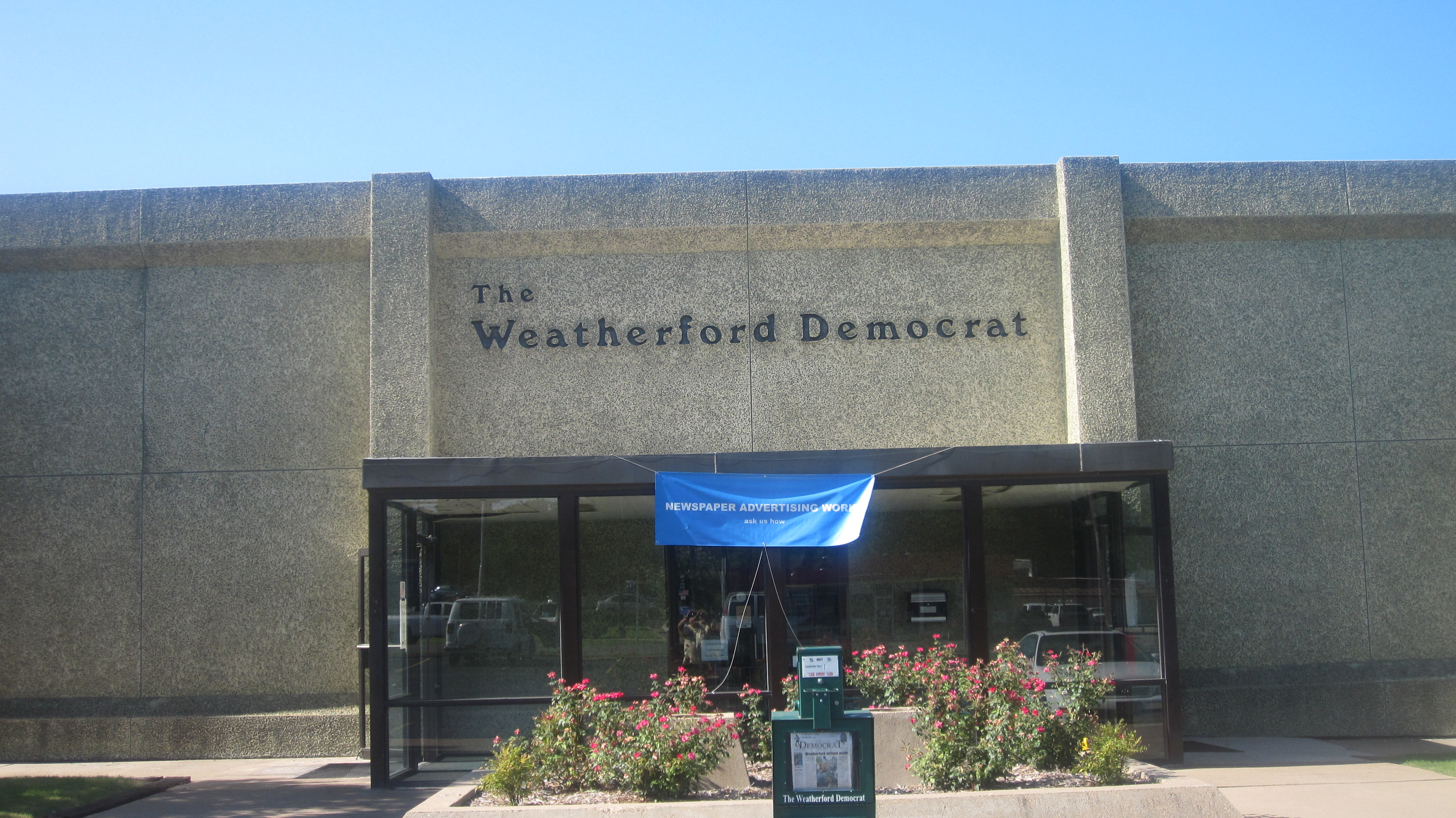
Weatherford Democrat newspaper

The Weatherford Democrat has been publishing since 1895. The Weatherford Telegram began publishing as a weekly newspaper in 2006.

== Transportation ==
=== Roads ===
==== Interstate ====
- I-20 is a major route that runs east-west through south Weatherford. To the east, the Interstate 20 goes through Hudson Oaks and Fort Worth. To the west, the I-20 passes by Brock.

==== U.S and state highways ====
- US 180 is a United States highway that runs east-west through downtown Weatherford. To the east, US 180 goes through Hudson Oaks then converges with I-20. To the west, US 180 goes through Cool and Mineral Wells.
- SH 171 is a Texas state highway that runs north-south through Weatherford. To the south, Texas State Highway 171 runs through Cresson.
- Spur 312 (Ranger Highway) is a Texas state highway spur that starts at US 180 and goes northeas-southwest, eventually converging with I-20.

==== Farm to Market roads ====
- FM 920 is a Farm to Market road that runs north-south through Weatherford. To the north, FM 920 goes through Peaster.
- FM 51 is a Farm to Market road that runs north-south through Weatherford. To the north, FM 51 goes through Springtown. To the south, FM 51 goes through Granbury.
- FM 730 is a Farm to Market road that runs northeast-southwest through Weatherford. To the north, FM 730 goes through Azle.

== Notable people ==
- Zach Britton, Major League Baseball (MLB) pitcher for the Baltimore Orioles and New York Yankees
- Mary Couts Burnett (1856–1924), philanthropist
- Douglas Chandor (1897–1953), British-born portrait painter and garden designer, designed the Chandor Gardens in Weatherford
- Thomas Stevenson Drew, the third governor of Arkansas, lived for a time in Weatherford
- Joe B. Frantz, historian on the faculty of the University of Texas at Austin
- Larry Hagman, actor, especially known for his roles of J. R. Ewing on television series Dallas and astronaut Major Tony Nelson on television series I Dream of Jeannie
- Phil King, politician, incumbent Texas senator District 10
- Bob Kingsley, radio personality
- Edwin Lanham, author, was reared in Weatherford
- Kapron Lewis-Moore, defensive lineman for the Baltimore Ravens
- Mary Martin, Broadway star, known for her portrayal of Peter Pan
- Ted Minor, racing driver
- Jack Porter, U.S. Senate candidate in 1948
- Taylor Sheridan, American screenwriter
- William Hood Simpson lieutenant general during World War II
- Bob Tallman, nationally known rodeo announcer, operates a ranch in Parker County
- Hippo Vaughn, MLB pitcher for the Chicago Cubs 1913–1921
- Roger Williams, U.S. representative, 105th Secretary of State of Texas
- Jim Wright, former speaker of the United States House of Representatives; grew up in Weatherford
