= Principal Place =

Mixed-use building in London, England

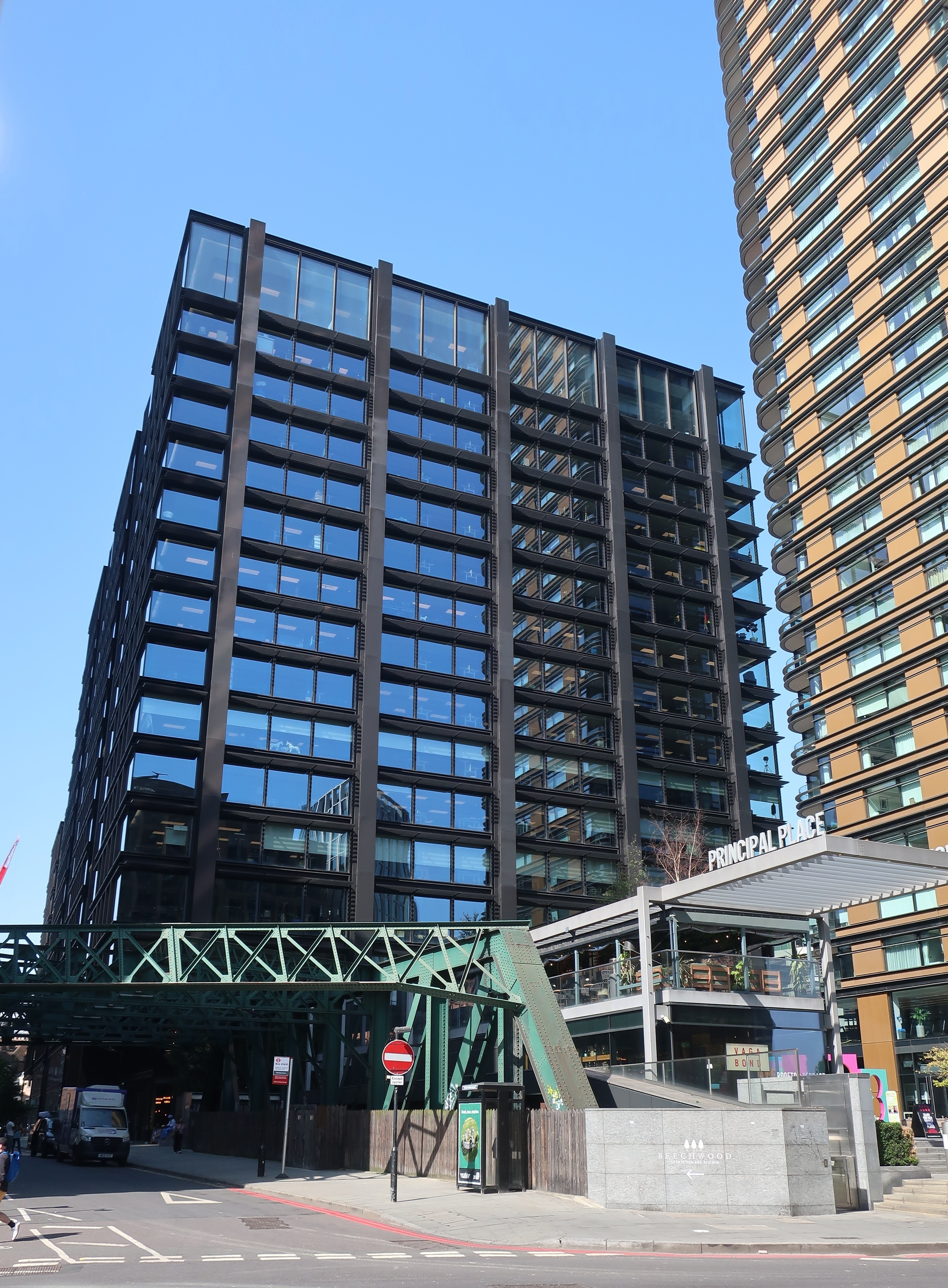
- Principal Place in September 2023, with the high-rise Principal Tower to the right

- Location within Greater London

General information
- Type: Mixed-use
- Location: London, England, EC2, 111 Worship Street
- Coordinates: 51.5216°N 0.0786°W
- Elevation: 25 m (82 ft)
- Current tenants: Amazon UK
- Completed: 2016
- Client: Amazon UK Ltd

Technical details
- Floor count: 15

Design and construction
- Architecture firm: Foster + Partners

Principal Place is a 15-storey office block in Shoreditch, London, designed by Foster and Partners and completed in 2016. Since 2018, it has been occupied by the internet retailer Amazon.com as its UK headquarters. It is situated at the eastern end of Worship Street, with the main entrance approached across a pedestrian piazza from Shoreditch High Street. Alongside Principal Place, and built as part of the same development, stands a 50-storey residential block named Principal Tower.

Immediately to the south of Principal Place, on the opposite side of Worship Street (and therefore within the boundaries of the City of London), stands Broadgate Tower.

== Development ==
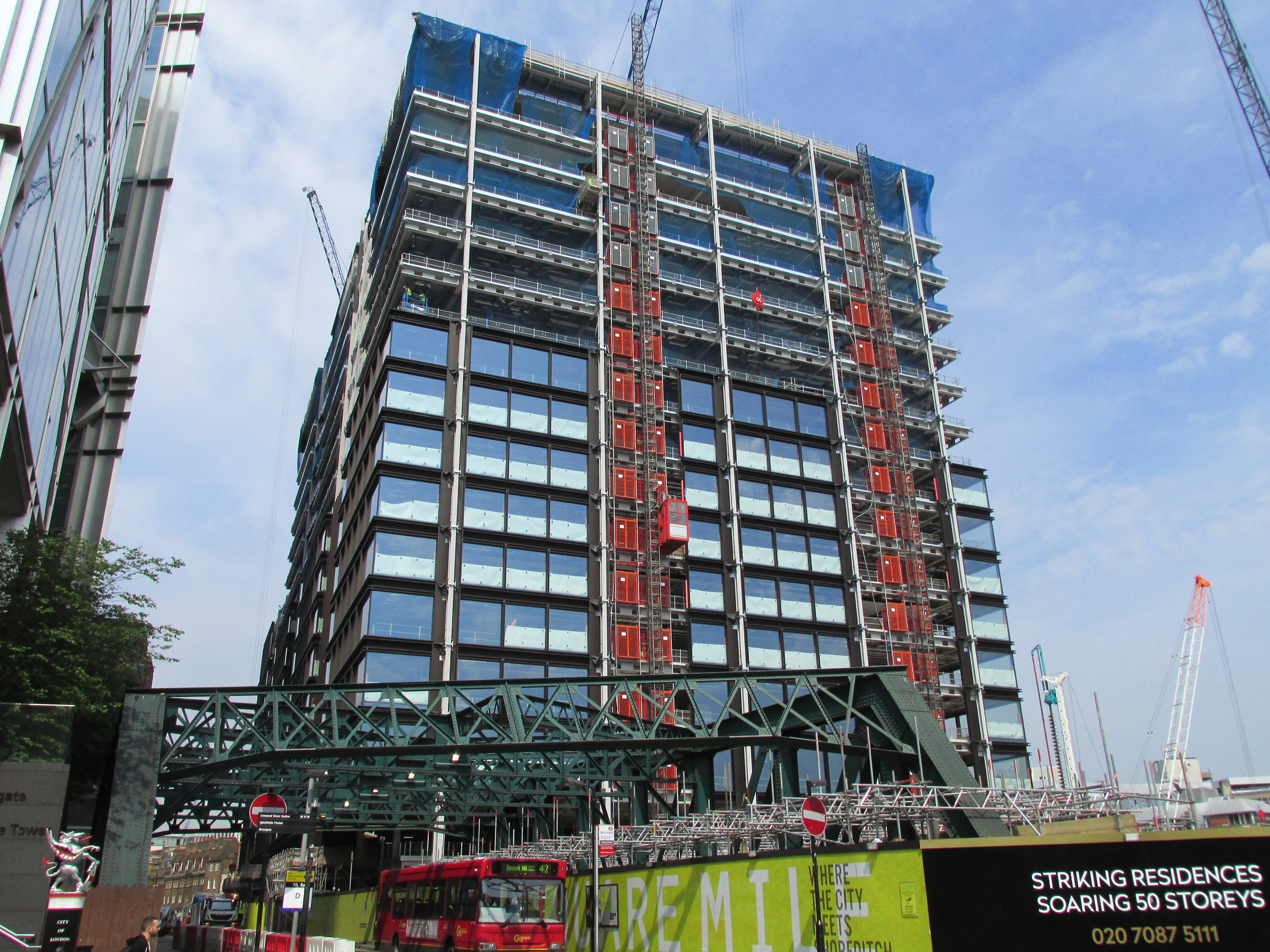
Principal Place under construction, June 2016

In July 2014, it was reported that Amazon was close to signing a lease to move its UK headquarters to Principal Place. The project had been on hold since January 2012, when the anchor tenant, the law firm CMS Cameron McKenna, pulled out. Soon after, the developer Hammerson sold its interest in the scheme to Brookfield. Amazon moved into the block in 2018.

== Archaeology ==
The development stands on part of the site of the extramural northern cemetery of Roman Londinium, and adjacent to Roman Ermine Street. An archaeological excavation undertaken in 2012, prior to the commencement of building work, discovered a hoard of 133 Roman coins (19 gold solidi and 114 silver siliquae; roughly equivalent to some 12 years' earnings for a late 4th-century legionary). The latest coin was dated to AD 397–402, and the hoard is thought to have been buried at the end of the first decade of the fifth century. Another investigation in 2015 discovered a group of four pits containing an assemblage of Early Neolithic pottery and struck flint.

== See also ==
- One Rathbone Square, former Meta UK headquarters, north of Oxford Street
