= Principal Tower =

Coordinates: 51.5220°N 0.0802°W

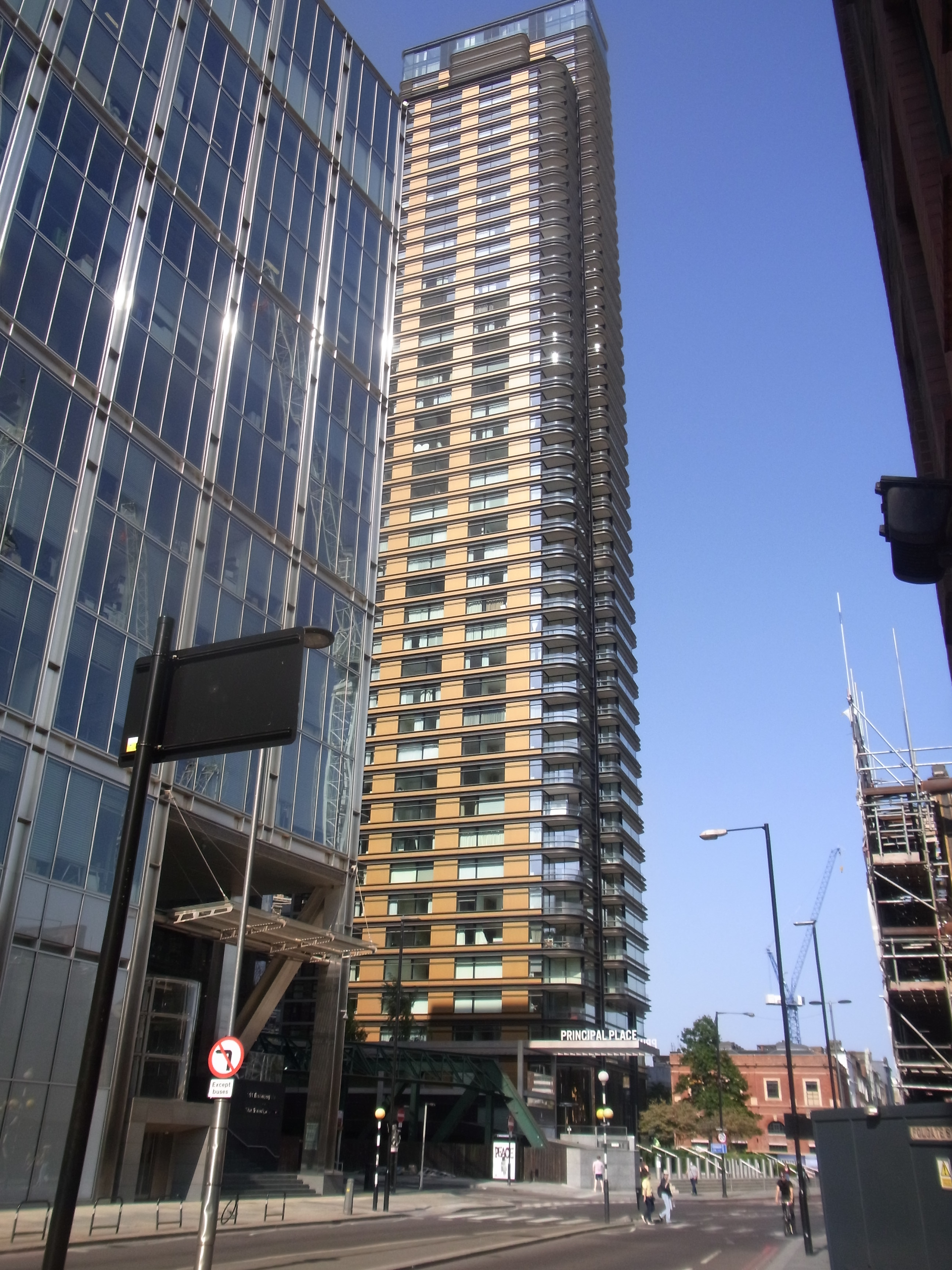
- Interactive map of the Principal Tower area

General information
- Status: Completed
- Type: Residential
- Architectural style: Modern
- Location: London, EC2; United Kingdom, 115 Worship Road
- Construction started: 2016
- Completed: 2019
- Opened: 2017
- Owner: Brookfield and Concord London

Height
- Architectural: 163 m (535 ft)

Technical details
- Floor count: 50

Design and construction
- Architect: Foster + Partners

Principal Tower is a 50-storey residential tower in Worship Street, Shoreditch, London. It was completed in 2019.

There are 298 apartments in the building, designed by the architects Foster and Partners.

It is next to the 15-storey office block Principal Place, also designed by Foster and Partners. In July 2014, it was reported that the internet retailer Amazon.com was close to signing a lease to move its UK headquarters there. The project had been on hold since January 2012, when the anchor tenant, the law firm CMS Cameron McKenna, pulled out. Soon after, the developer Hammerson sold its interest in the scheme to Brookfield.

== Image gallery ==
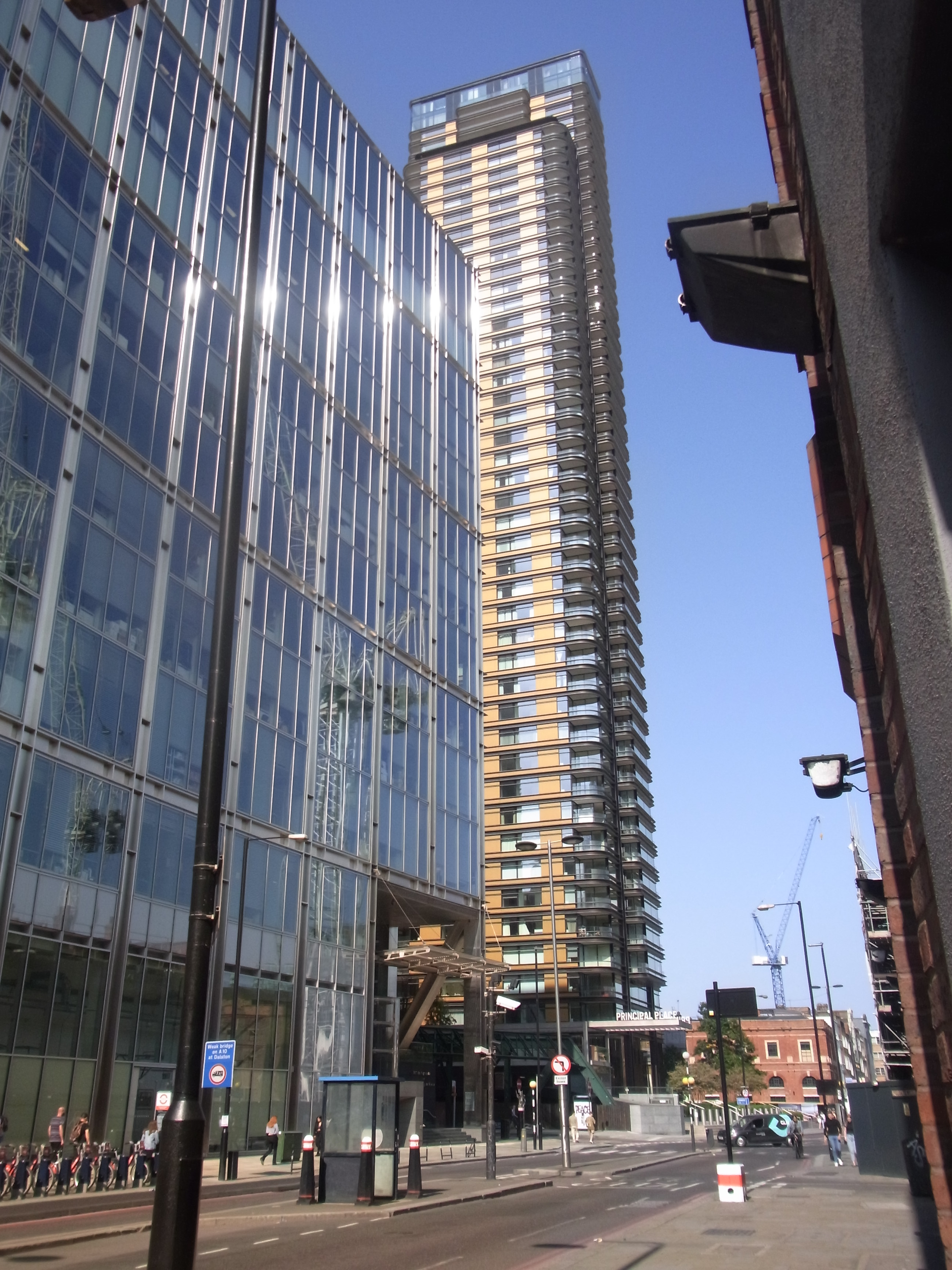
Principal Tower and Place, Shoreditch in September, 2020

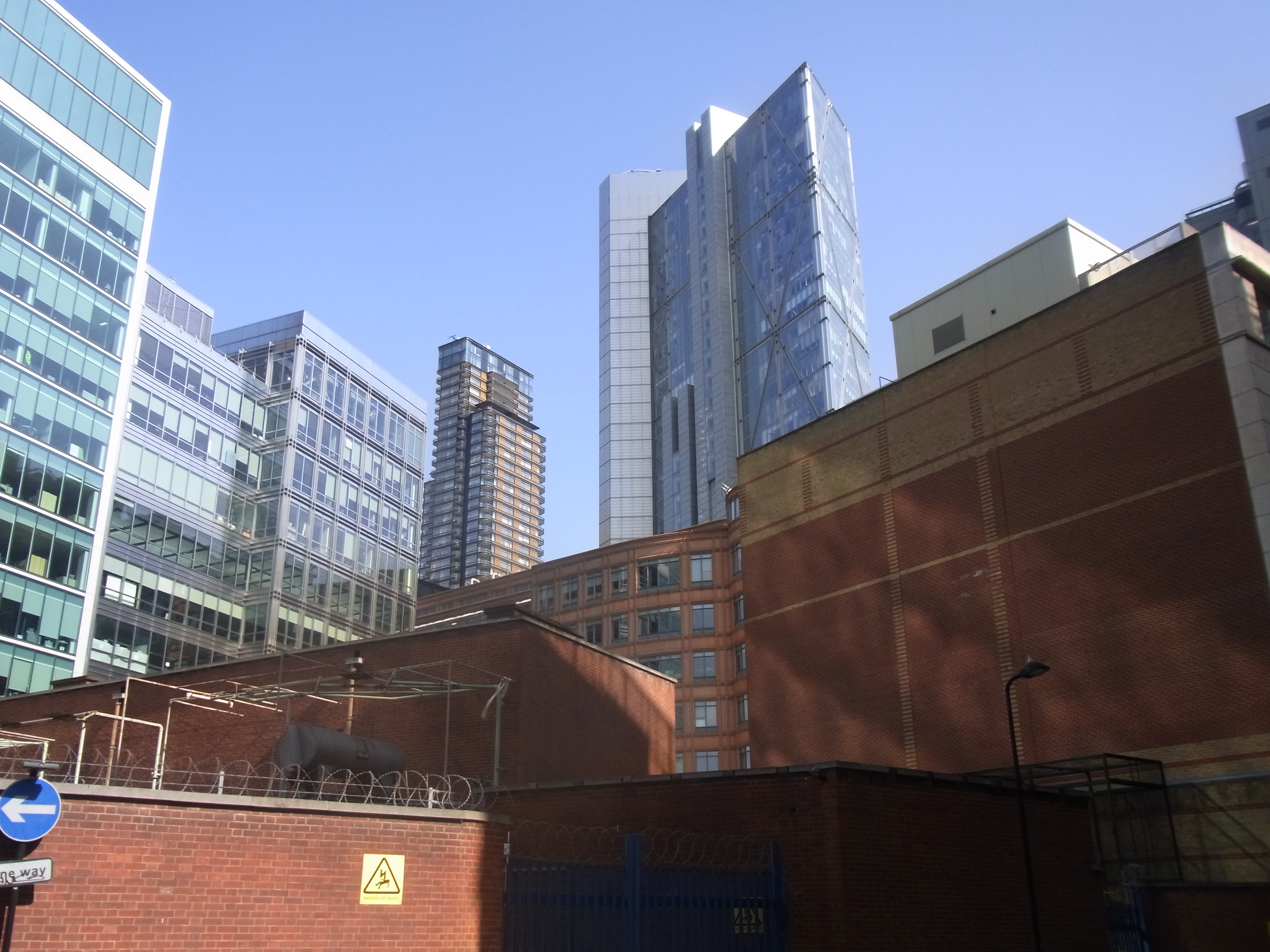
Principal Tower and Place, Shoreditch alongside the Broadgate Tower of the City of London in September, 2020
