= One Rathbone Square =

- Facebook London (former)
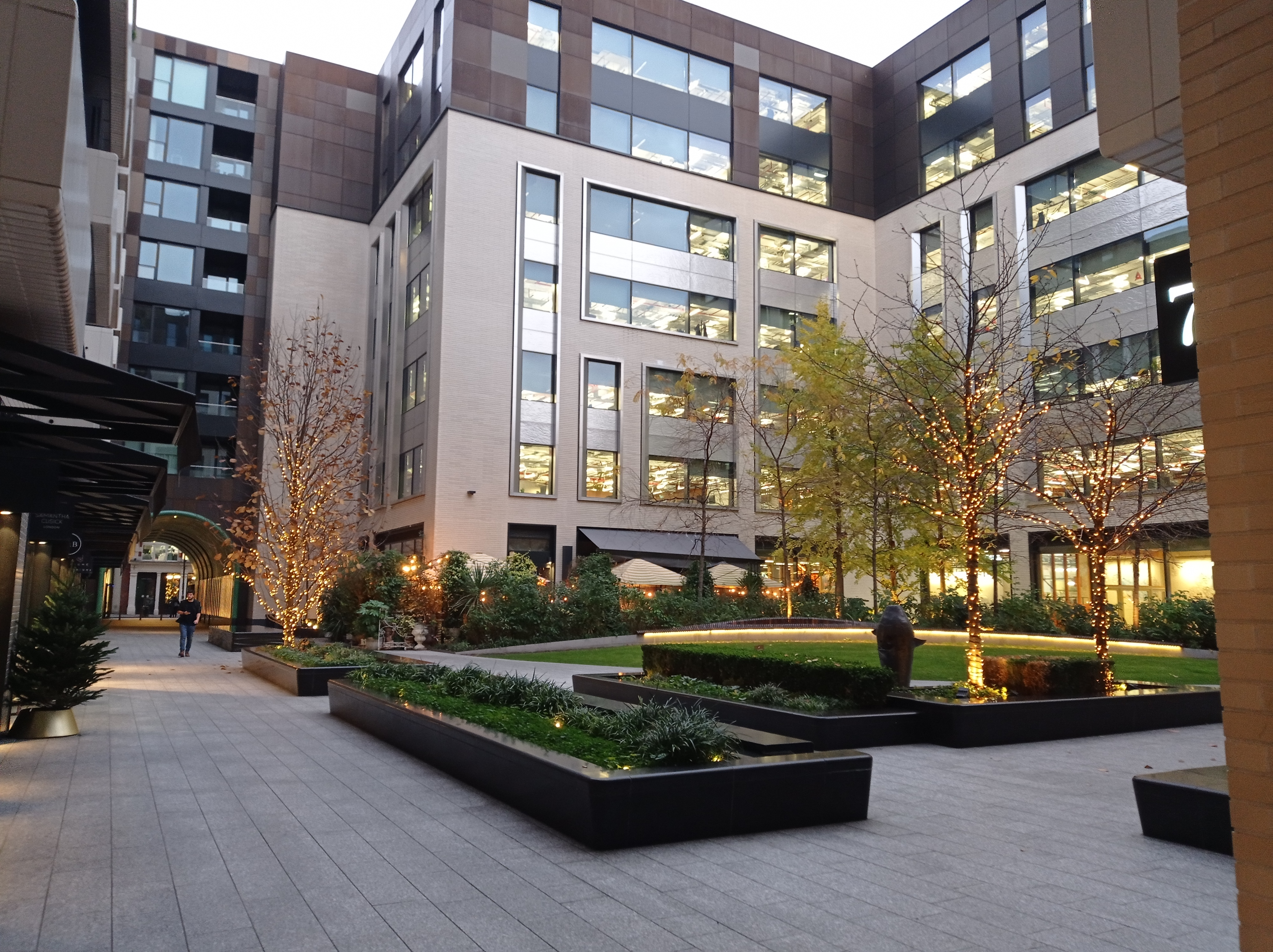

- Location within Greater London
- Former names: 35-50 Rathbone Place

General information
- Type: Company headquarters
- Location: 1 Rathbone Square, Fitzrovia, London, W1T 1FB
- Coordinates: 51.517°N 0.1343°W
- Elevation: 25 m (82 ft)
- Current tenants: Facebook London
- Construction started: July 2014
- Completed: March 2017
- Inaugurated: 4 December 2017
- Client: Facebook UK Ltd

Technical details
- Floor count: 7
- Floor area: 242,800 square feet (22,560 m^{2})

Design and construction
- Architect: Graham Longman
- Architecture firm: Make Architects, Frank Gehry
- Structural engineer: AKT II
- Services engineer: Hilson Moran

One Rathbone Square is a commercial building in London, and was the UK headquarters of Facebook.

== History ==
Rathbone Square is a 2.3 acres (0.93 ha) development in central London. The site was bought from Royal Mail Group for £120m in September 2011; it was the former West End Delivery Office.

=== Design ===
Planning consent was granted from Westminster City Council in February 2014. The main architect for the site was Graham Longman; Make Architects were given the project in October 2011.

=== Construction ===
Construction began in July 2014, with demolition of the former seven-storey site. Main construction began in 2015.

== Structure ==
It is situated off Oxford Street, in the east of the City of Westminster, and is on the boundary with the London Borough of Camden. It is about 500m south-east of the BT Tower, which can be seen along the neighbouring Rathbone Place. The site costs Facebook £17.8m per year to rent, with a fifteen-year term on the contract.

It features a build called LDN_LAB, a business incubator for tech startup companies.

== See also ==
- Principal Place, Amazon UK headquarters in Shoreditch on Bishopsgate (A10)
- Banksy, One_Nation_Under_CCTV
