= Broadgate Tower =

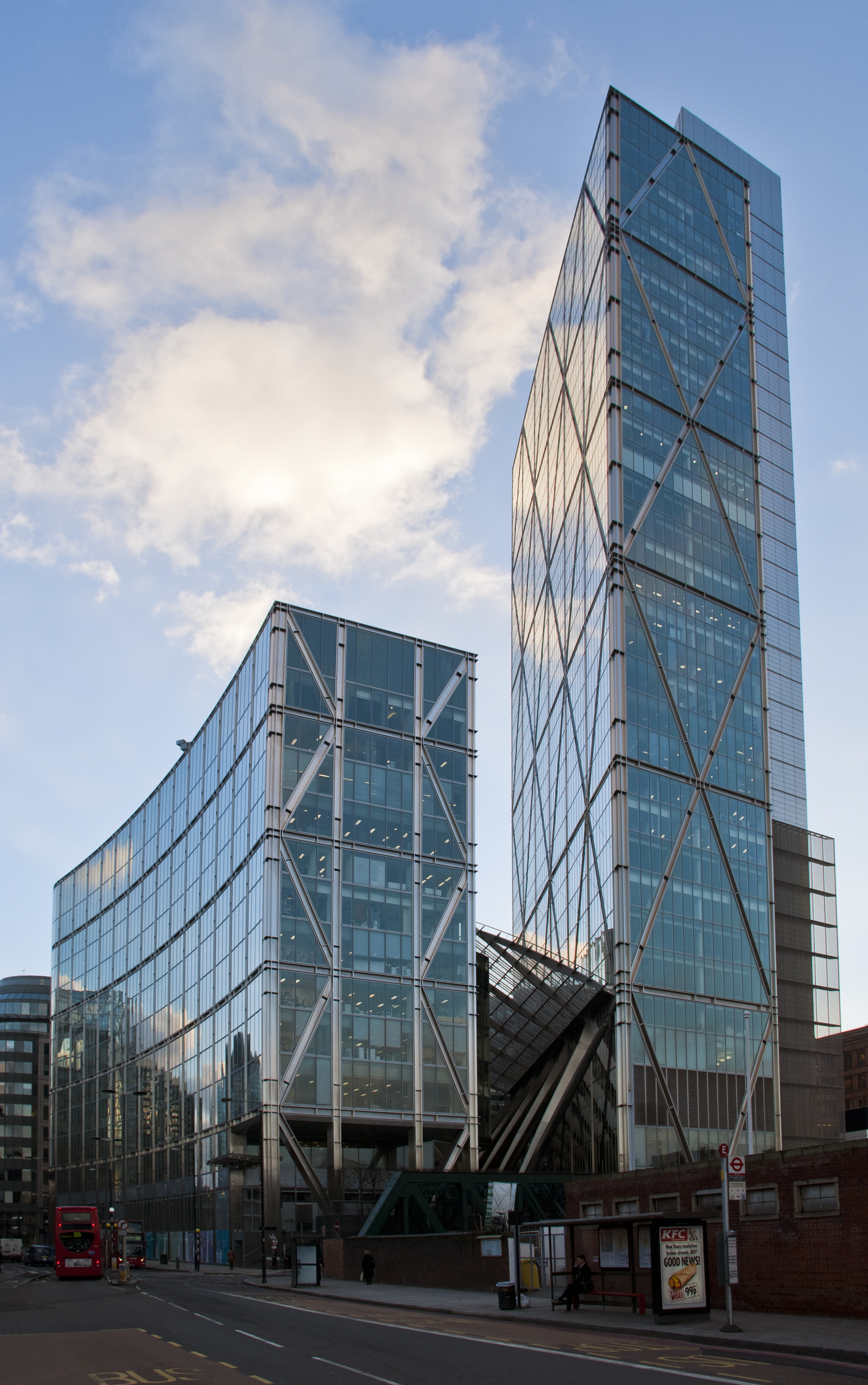
- Interactive map of the Broadgate Tower area

General information
- Status: Completed
- Location: London, EC2; United Kingdom
- Coordinates: 51.5213°N 0.0798°W
- Construction started: 2005
- Completed: 2009
- Cost: c. £240 million

Height
- Roof: 165 metres (541 ft)

Technical details
- Floor count: 33
- Floor area: 37,000.3 m^{2} (398,268 sq ft)

Design and construction
- Architect: Skidmore, Owings & Merrill
- Developer: British Land
- Structural engineer: Skidmore, Owings & Merrill
- Main contractor: Bovis Lend Lease

Broadgate Tower is a skyscraper in London's main financial district, the City of London. It was constructed between 2005 and 2008.

== History ==
The developer for the site was British Land. In February 2005 Broadgate Plaza Ltd, a subsidiary of British Land, submitted a planning application to the City of London for the construction of two buildings of 33 stories and 13 stories. Broadgate Tower, which was designed by Skidmore, Owings & Merrill and built by Bovis Lend Lease, was completed in 2008. It was constructed at the same time as the neighbouring building, 201 Bishopsgate, and the two are separated by a covered pedestrian area.

The building was used in the James Bond Skyfall movie to represent a Shanghai skyscraper.

== Occupants ==
Current occupants include:

- Aldermore Bank
- ClearBank
- Collibra
- Coyle Personnel
- Dickson Minto
- Droit
- Equiniti
- Gill Jennings & Every
- Harmony Fire
- Hill Dickinson
- Itau Bank
- Itochu
- Regus
- Reed Smith
- Rokt
- SOM
- Tradetech Alpha
- Trading Hub
- William Blair
- Your World

== Construction gallery ==
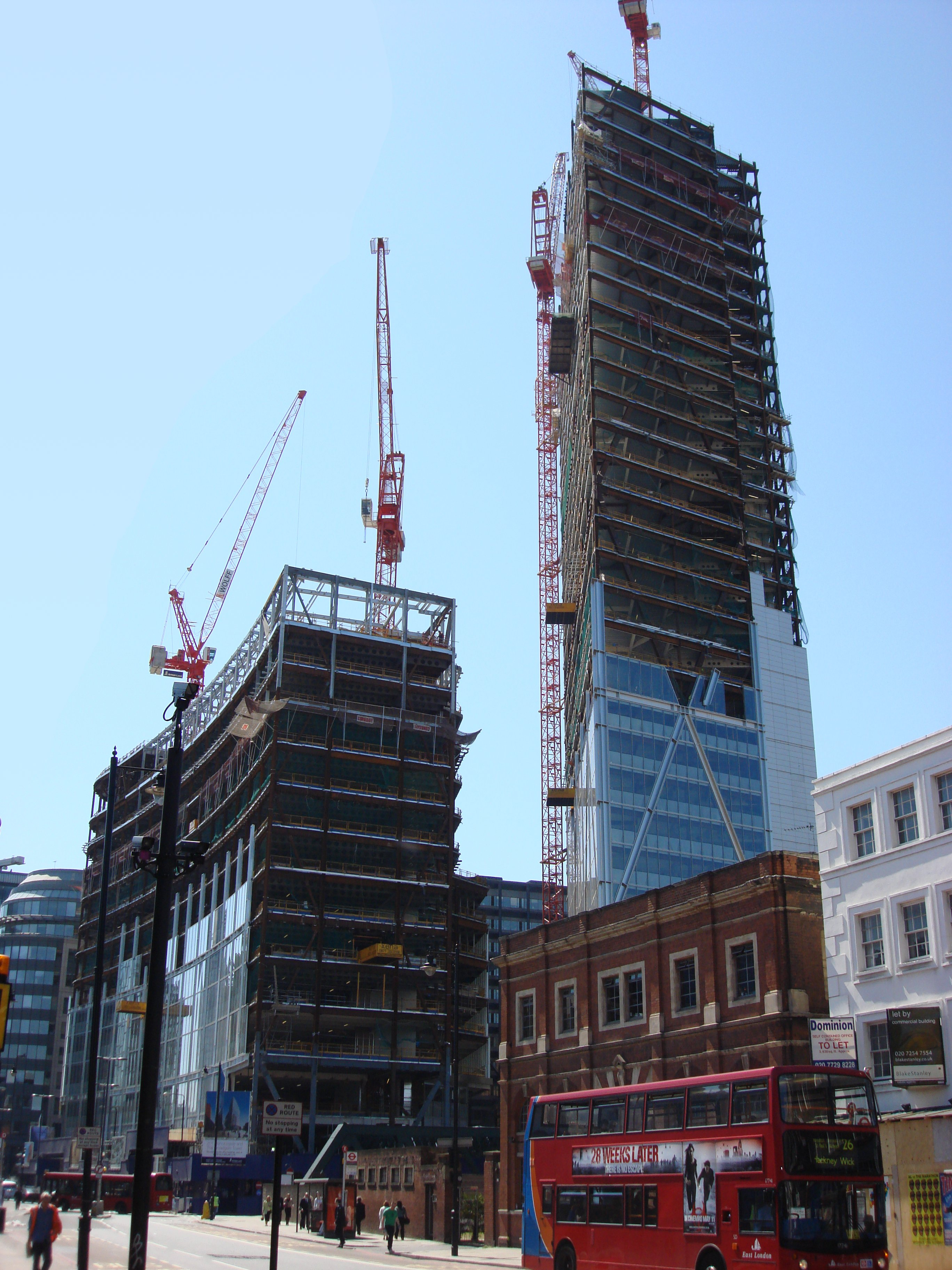
Broadgate Tower under construction in early 2007.

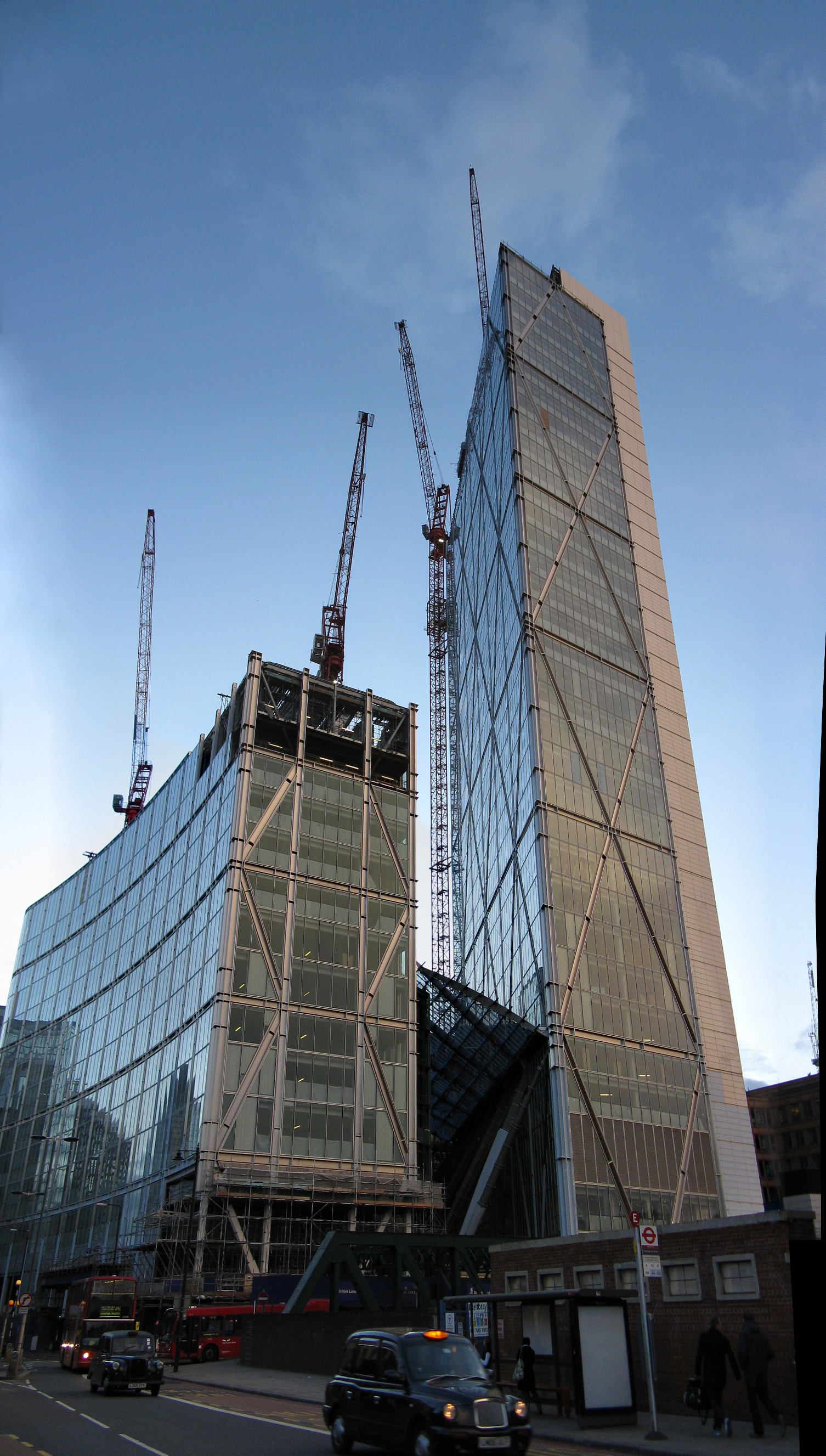
Broadgate Tower in December 2007

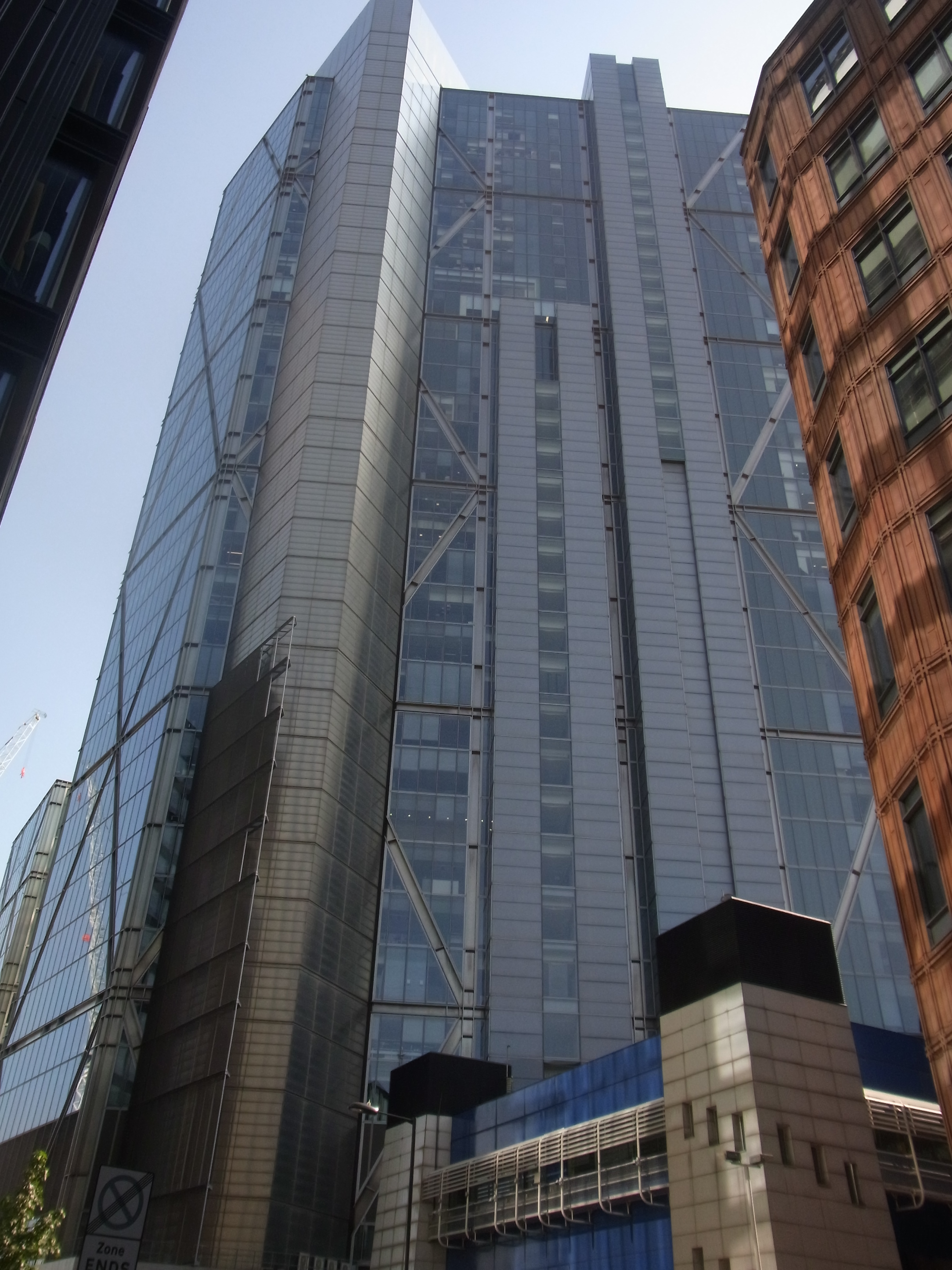
Broadgate Tower in September 2020

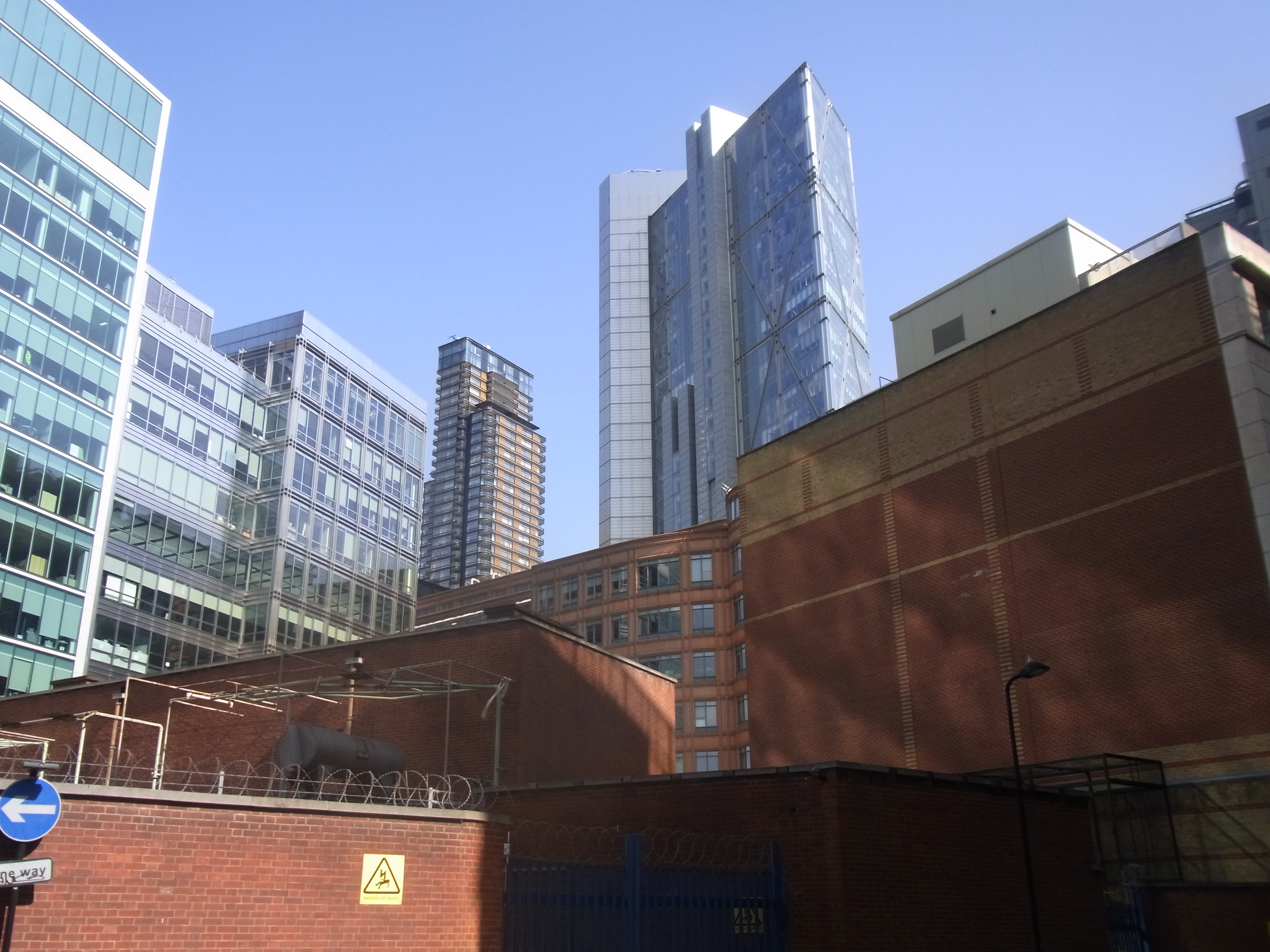
Broadgate Tower (right) alongside Principal Tower in September 2020

== See also ==
- City of London Landmarks
- Heron Tower
- Tower 42
- 30 St Mary Axe
- List of tallest buildings and structures in London
