= Foster and Partners =

British design, architecture, engineering and planning firm

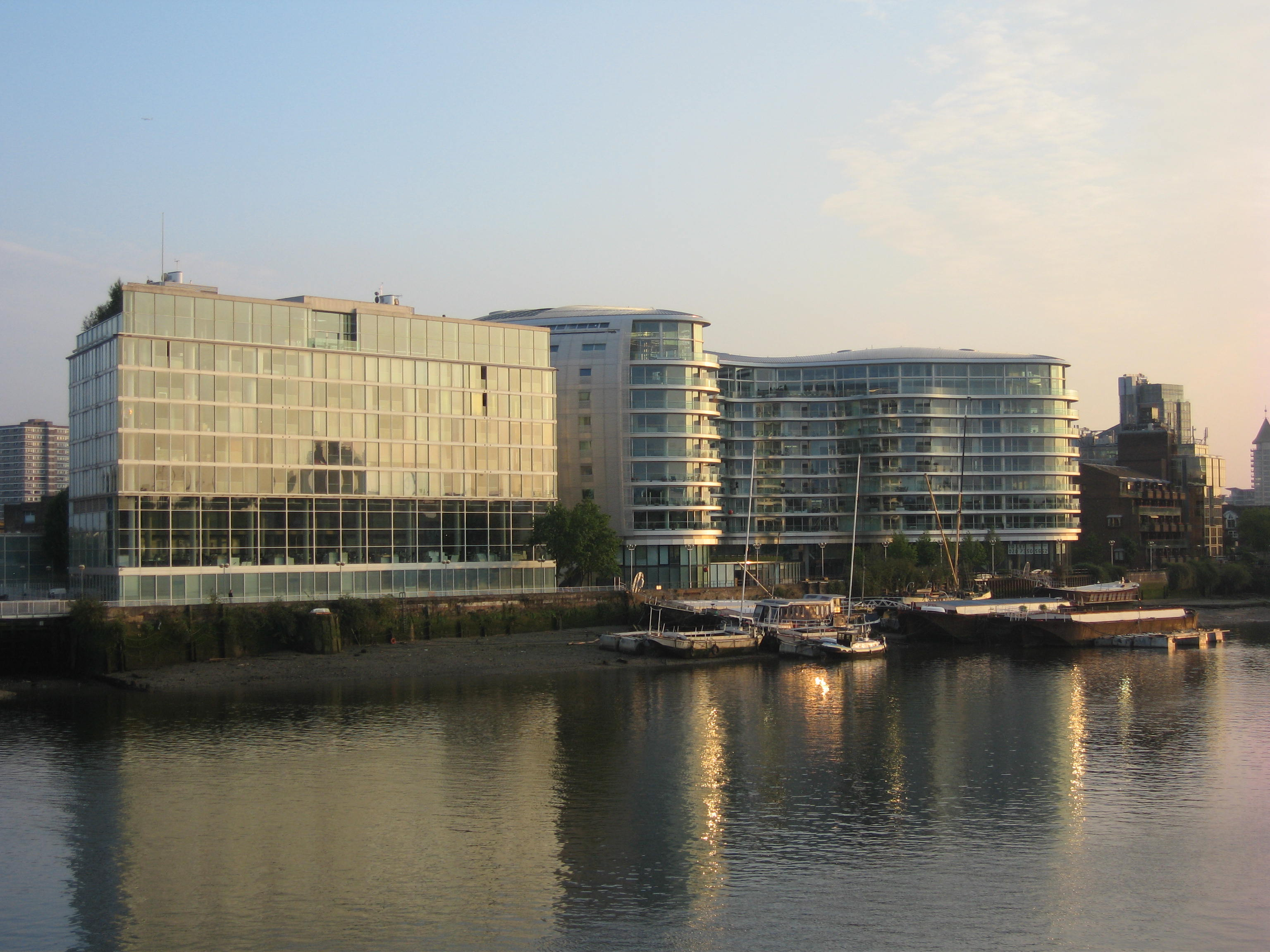
- Type: Private company
- Industry: Architecture, engineering, urban planning
- Founded: 1967; 59 years ago
- Founder: Norman Foster, Baron Foster of Thames Bank
- Headquarters: London, England, United Kingdom
- Area served: International
- Key people: Norman Foster (executive chairman); Stuart Latham (Managing Partner)
- Services: Architecture, design, industrial design
- Revenue: £571.2 million (2024/25)
- Number of employees: 2,500 (2026)
- Website: fosterandpartners.com

Foster and Partners (styled as Foster + Partners) is a British international architecture firm, which is headquartered in London, England. It was founded in 1967 by British architect and designer Norman Foster. The firm has been involved in the design of major projects around the world, with many early projects incorporating high-tech architecture and modernist design styles. The firm's practice has also focused on sustainable architecture.

Its design practice spans residential, civic and cultural buildings, office and headquarters and transport infrastructure, with notable projects including The Great Court of the British Museum, the 1990s renovation of the Reichstag in Berlin, the Gherkin in London, the Hearst Tower in New York City, the Millau Viaduct in France and Hong Kong International Airport.

In addition to architectural design, the firm's practice encompasses engineering and industrial design. As of 2021, the firm had approximately 1,500 employees, located in offices in multiple cities, including New York City, Hong Kong, and Madrid. The firm has won both the Pritzker Architecture Prize and the Stirling Prize. By 2024, Foster + Partners had reached annual revenue of more than half a billion dollars.

== History ==
The firm was established by the architect Norman Foster in 1967, shortly after leaving his first studio, Team 4. The firm was originally called Foster Associates before becoming Sir Norman Foster and Partners in 1992, then Foster & Partners in 1999, and finally Foster + Partners in 2006.

The firm was chosen by Robert Sainsbury to design the Sainsbury Centre for Visual Arts, which was completed in 1978. Located at the University of East Anglia in Norwich, England, the 500 foot-long steel structure was designed to house the Sainsbury’s art collection. The project was the firm’s first public building.

In 1979, Foster + Partners won an international design competition to design the new HSBC headquarters in Hong Kong. When the building was completed, it was the most expensive building in the world.

The firm was chosen to renovate the Reichstag in Berlin after being selected in a design competition in 1992. The renovation was completed in 1999.

Foster + Partners was the selected architectural firm to design a new skyscraper in London, which would be built on the site of the Baltic Exchange building. The site had been heavily damaged by an IRA bomb in 1992. The building, known as 30 St Mary Axe or its nickname, “The Gherkin,” was completed in 2004 for Swiss Re.

In 2001, construction began on the Norman Foster-designed Millau Viaduct spanning the Tarn Gorge in southern France. The bridge was completed in 2004 and as of 2024 was the tallest bridge in the world.

Foster divided the architectural staff into six architectural studios in 2003 and appointed partners of the firm to lead each one.

In 2007, the private equity company 3i took a stake in the firm.

The firm was approached by Steve Jobs in 2009 to develop 75 acres in Cupertino, California into the new headquarters of Apple; Jobs consulted on the design until his death in 2011. The campus, known as Apple Park, cost $5 billion and opened in 2017.

The practice regained complete ownership in June 2014, when the 140 partners bought it back from 3i.

In October 2021, a stake in the firm was bought for an undisclosed sum by a Canadian private investor, Hennick & Company, which became the single largest shareholder of the firm. Foster retains a controlling interest. In November 2023, Spencer de Grey stepped back from his role as Senior Executive Partner at the firm.

Following the death of Queen Elizabeth II, Foster + Partners was selected to design her memorial in June 2025. The Memorial to Elizabeth II, London will be located in St James's Park, with the final design approved in early 2026.

== Services ==
Foster + Partners is a multidisciplinary practice. The firm has six studios which provide a range of services related to architecture and design. The firm maintains an in-house engineering practice that includes structural and environmental engineering, and the Foster + Partners industrial design studio develops products at both commercial and standalone scale, including furniture and lighting.

The firm has led large-scale projects through its urban design and masterplanning studio, including the master plan for the rebuilding of the Hatay Province in Turkey following the 2023 earthquakes that devastated the region.

== Notable projects ==
Notable projects ordered by year of completion and type:

=== Masterplans ===
- More London, London, UK (1998–2000)
- Duisburg Inner Harbour, Germany (1991–2003)
- Trafalgar Square redevelopment, London, UK (1996–2003)
- Quartermile, Edinburgh, Scotland (2001–)
- Masdar City, Abu Dhabi, UAE (2007–)
- West Kowloon Cultural District, Hong Kong (2009)
- Thames Hub, UK (2011–)
- Central Square, Cardiff, Wales
- Amaravati, India (under construction)

=== Airports ===
- Hong Kong International Airport, Hong Kong (1998)
- Red Sea International Airport, Tabuk, Saudi Arabia (2021–)
- Techo International Airport, Phnom Penh, Cambodia (2025)

=== Bridges ===
- Millau Viaduct, the tallest bridge in the world (2004)
- Western Årsta Bridge, Sweden (1994/2005)
- Millennium Bridge, London, UK (1998–2002)

=== Government ===
- Reichstag building redevelopment, Berlin, Germany (1999)
- London City Hall, UK (2002)
- New Supreme Court Building, Singapore (2015)
- Palace of Peace and Reconciliation, Astana, Kazakhstan (2006)
- Buenos Aires City Hall (new headquarters), Buenos Aires, Argentina (2015)

=== Cultural ===
- Sainsbury Centre for Visual Arts, University of East Anglia, Norwich, UK (1978)
- Clyde Auditorium, part of the Scottish Exhibition and Conference Centre complex, Glasgow (1997)
- Sackler Galleries, Royal Academy of Arts, London, UK (1985–1991)
- Carré d'Art, Nîmes, France (1984–1993)
- American Air Museum, Imperial War Museum Duxford, UK (1997) – Stirling Prize
- Queen Elizabeth II Great Court redevelopment, British Museum, London, UK (2000)
- The Sage Gateshead, Gateshead, UK (1997–2004)
- The Zénith, Zénith de Saint-Étienne, Saint-Étienne, France (2004–2007)
- The Robert and Arlene Kogod Courtyard, Smithsonian Institution, National Portrait Gallery, Washington, D.C., US (2004–2007)
- Winspear Opera House, Dallas, US (2003–2009)
- Art of the Americas Wing, Museum of Fine Arts, Boston, Boston, US (1999–2010)
- Khan Shatyr Entertainment Center, Astana, Kazakhstan (2006–2010)
- Sperone Westwater Gallery, New York City, US (2008–2010)
- Extension to Lenbachhaus art museum, Munich, Germany (2013)
- OVO Hydro, Glasgow, Scotland (2004–2013)
- Datong Art Museum, China (2011–2022)
- Hall of Realms, Madrid, Spain (2018–2021)

=== Higher education ===
- Kings Norton Library, Cranfield University, UK (1994)
- Faculty of Law, Cambridge, Cambridge, UK (1995)
- Faculty of Management (now known as Aberdeen Business School), The Robert Gordon University, UK (1998)
- Imperial College School of Medicine, Sir Alexander Fleming Building, London, UK (1994–1998)
- Center for Clinical Science Research, Stanford University Stanford, California, US (1995–2000)
- British Library of Political and Economic Science, London School of Economics, London, UK (1993–2001)
- Imperial College London, Flowers Building, London, UK (1997–2001)
- Faculty of Social Studies, University of Oxford, UK (1996–2002)
- James H. Clark Center, Stanford, California, US (1999–2003)
- Universiti Teknologi Petronas, Tronoh, Perak, Malaysia (2004)
- London Academy, Edgware, London, UK (2004)
- Tanaka Business School, renamed the Imperial College Business School, London, UK (2004)
- Free University of Berlin, Berlin, Germany (2005)
- Leslie Dan Faculty of Pharmacy, University of Toronto, Toronto, Canada (2006)
- Library, California State University Channel Islands, Camarillo, California, US (2000–2008)
- Yale School of Management, new campus, New Haven, US (2013)
- Masdar Institute of Science and Technology, Abu Dhabi, UAE (2007–2015)
- China Resources University, Shenzhen, China (2011–2016)
- Health Education Campus (HEC), Case Western Reserve University, Cleveland Clinic, Cleveland, Ohio, US (2015–2019), location of the first U.S. 2020 Presidential Debate between Donald Trump and Joe Biden.
- York University, Toronto, Canada (2018)
- Edmond and Lily Safra Center for Brain Sciences, Hebrew University of Jerusalem, 2009

=== Sport ===
- Wembley Stadium reconstruction, London, UK (2007)
- Lusail Iconic Stadium, Lusail, Qatar (2010)

=== Transportation ===
- Stansted Airport, Uttlesford, UK (1991)
- Bilbao Metro, Spain (1997) – Line 2 (2004)
- Hong Kong International Airport, Chek Lap Kok, Hong Kong (1998)
- Canary Wharf tube station, London, UK (1999)
- Expo MRT station, Singapore (2001)
- Dresden Hauptbahnhof redevelopment, Dresden, Germany (1997–2006)
- Beijing Capital International Airport, Beijing, China (2008)
- Heathrow Terminal 2, London, UK
- Spaceport America, New Mexico, US (2005–2013)
- Four railway stations for the Haramain High Speed Rail Project, Saudi Arabia
- Kai Tak Cruise Terminal, Hong Kong (2013)
- Mexico City Texcoco Airport, Mexico (projected 2020)
- Slussenområdet redevelopment, Stockholm, Sweden (projected 2022)
- Queen Alia International Airport, Amman, Jordan (2005–2013)
- Thames Hub, UK (from 2011)
- Thames Hub Airport, UK (from 2013)
- Ocean Terminal extension, Hong Kong
- York University station – TYSSE, Vaughan, Ontario/Toronto, Canada (2017)
- Red Sea International Airport, Hanak, Saudi Arabia (2023)
- Tocumen International Airport Terminal 2, Panama City, Panama (2023)
- Gadigal and Barangaroo Metro stations, Sydney (2024)
- Techo International Airport, Phnom Penh, Cambodia (2025)
- Solidarity Transport Hub or Central Communication/Transport Port, Baranów, Poland (2027)

=== Office ===
- Fred. Olsen Lines terminal, London Docklands, UK (1971)
- Willis Building, Ipswich, UK (1971–1975)
- HSBC Tower, Hong Kong (1986)
- Commerzbank Tower, Frankfurt, Germany (1997)
- Citigroup Centre, London, UK (1996–2000)
- World Port Center, Rotterdam, the Netherlands (1998-2001)
- 8 Canada Square (global headquarters of HSBC Group, London, UK (1997–2002)
- The Gherkin, London, UK – Swiss Re headquarters (2004) – Stirling Prize
- McLaren Technology Centre, base for the McLaren Formula One team and McLaren Group, Woking, UK (2004)
- Deutsche Bank Place, Sydney (1997–2005)
- Hearst Tower, New York City, US (2006)
- Willis Building, London, UK (2001–2007)
- Torre Cepsa, Madrid, Spain (2002–2009)
- Principal Place, Shoreditch, London (2012–2016) – UK headquarters of Amazon
- Apple Park (corporate headquarters of Apple Inc.), Cupertino, California, US (2013–2017)
- Bloomberg London (European headquarters), London UK (2017) – Stirling Prize
- Hankook Technoplex, Daejeon, South Korea (2016–2020)
- Varso (the tallest building in Poland and in the European Union), Warsaw, Poland (2022)
- 425 Park Avenue, New York City, US (2022)
- Russian Copper Company Headquarters, Yekaterinburg, Russia (2020)
- DJI Sky City (DJI headquarter), Shenzhen, China (2022)
- MOL Campus (the tallest Building in Hungary), Budapest, Hungary (2022)

=== Leisure ===
- The Great Glasshouse, National Botanic Garden of Wales, Wales, UK (1995–2000)
- Elephant House, Copenhagen Zoo#Foster's Elephant House, Copenhagen, Denmark (2002–2008)
- Dolder Grand restoration, Zürich, Switzerland (2002–2008)
- Faustino Winery Bodegas Faustino, Castilla y Leon, Spain (2007–2010)
- Le Dôme winery, Saint-Émilion, France (−2021)
- ME Hotel, ME by Meliá, London, UK (2004–2013)
- The Murray, Hong Kong (2018)

=== Mixed use ===
- Albion Riverside, London, UK (1998–2003)
- Al Faisaliyah Center, Riyadh, Saudi Arabia (1994–2000)
- The Index (Dubai), Dubai, UAE (2010)
- The Troika, Kuala Lumpur, Malaysia (2004–2011)
- The Bow, Calgary, Canada (2005–2013)
- Central Market Project, Abu Dhabi, UAE (2006–2013)
- One Central Park, Sydney, Australia (2012–2013)
- 2 World Trade Center (formerly 200 Greenwich Street), New York City, US (predicted completion date 2031)
- CityCenterDC, Washington, D.C., US
- Crystal Island, Moscow, Russia (completion date not set yet)
- Hermitage Plaza, La Défense, Paris, France (from 2008)
- India Tower, Mumbai, India (cancelled)
- Oceanwide Center, San Francisco, US (predicted completion date 2021)
- Comcast Technology Center, Philadelphia, US (completed 2018)
- VietinBank Business Center Office Tower, Hanoi, Vietnam (predicted completion date 2017)
- Principal Place (including Principal Tower), London, UK (2017)
- Battersea Power Station Phase 3, London, UK (under construction)
- The One, Toronto, Canada (projected 2024)

=== Residential ===
- The Murezzan, St Moritz, Switzerland (2003–2007)
- Regent Place, Sydney, Australia (2003–2007)
- Jameson House, Vancouver, Canada (2004–2011)
- The Aleph, Buenos Aires, Argentina (2006–2013)
- Anfa Place, Casablanca, Morocco (2007–2013)
- Faena House, Miami Beach, US
- The Towers by Foster + Partners, Miami, US (2016)
- Arcoris Mont Kiara, Malaysia (projected 2016)
- 100 East 53rd Street (formerly 610 Lexington Avenue), New York City, US (2019)
- 50 United Nations Plaza, New York City, US (2015)
- Ocean Tower, Mumbai, India (projected 2022)
- The Estate Makati, Makati, Philippines (projected 2023)

=== Retail ===
- Apple Zorlu Centre, Istanbul, Turkey (2013)
- Apple Regent Street, London, UK (2015)
- Apple Union Square, San Francisco, USA (2016)
- Apple Michigan Avenue, Chicago, USA (2016)
- Apple Orchard Road, Singapore (2016)
- Apple Dubai Mall, Dubai, UAE (2016)
- Apple Michigan Avenue, Chicago, USA (2017)
- Apple Piazza Liberty, Milan, Italy (2017)
- Apple Fifth Avenue, New York City, USA (2019) - renovation
- Apple at The Grove, Los Angeles, USA (2021)
- Apple Ginza, Tokyo, Japan (2025)

=== Current ===
- BBC Cymru Wales New Broadcasting House, Cardiff, Wales
- Amaravati, India (under construction)
- 270 Park Avenue redevelopment, New York, United States (under construction)
- Transamerica Pyramid, San Francisco, United States (renovation)

=== Selected works ===
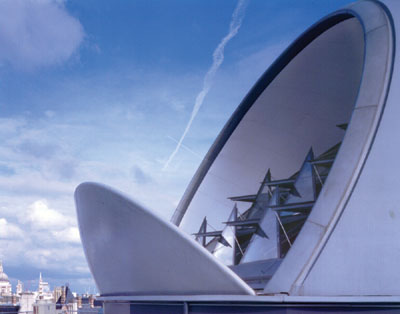
The British Library of Political and Economic Science

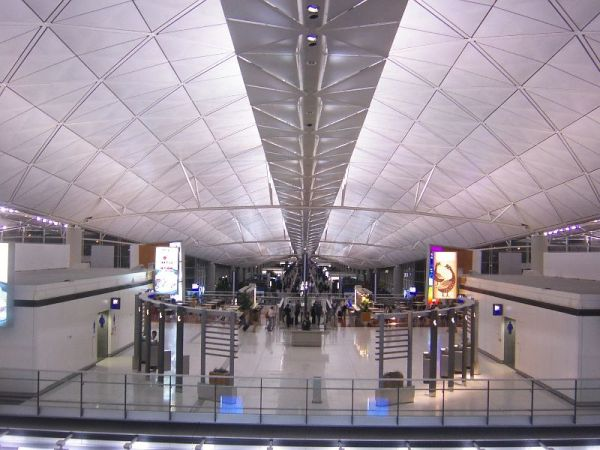
The futuristic interior roof of Hong Kong International Airport

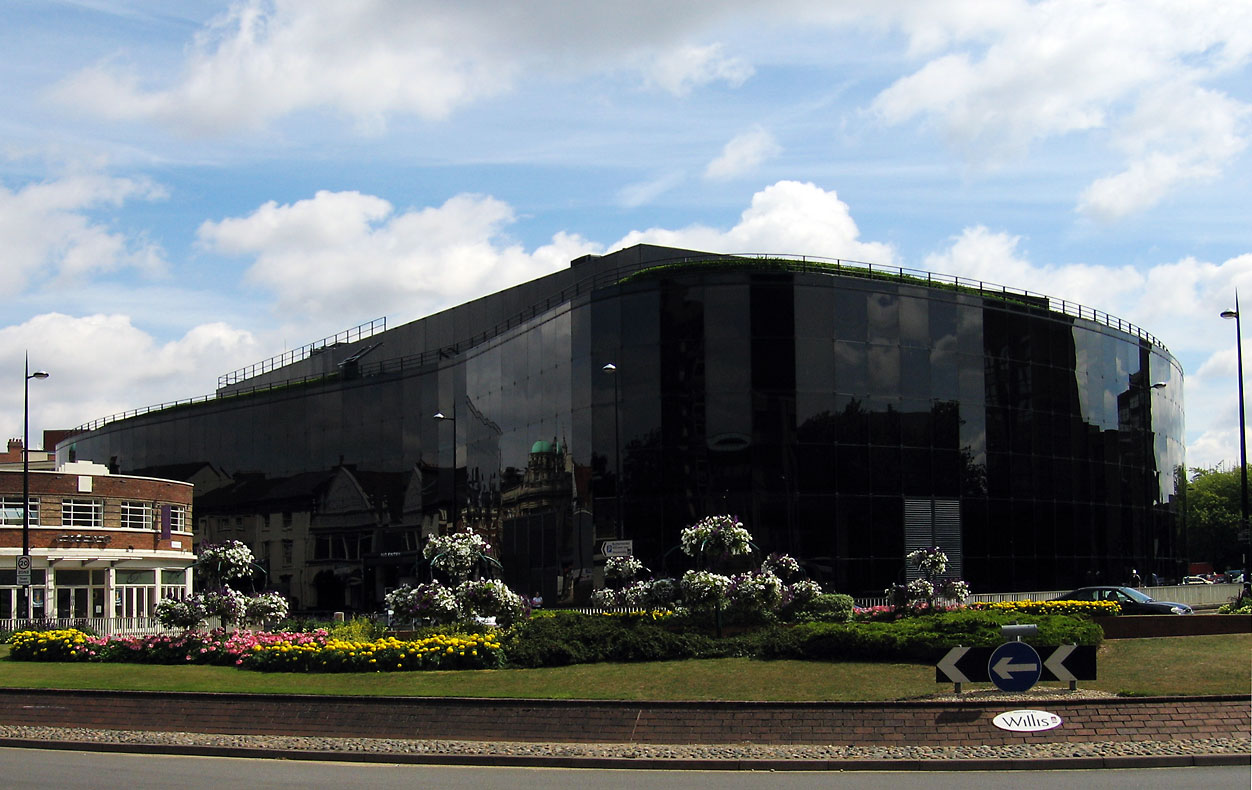
The Willis Faber and Dumas Headquarters in Ipswich was one of Foster's earliest commissions after founding Foster Associates.

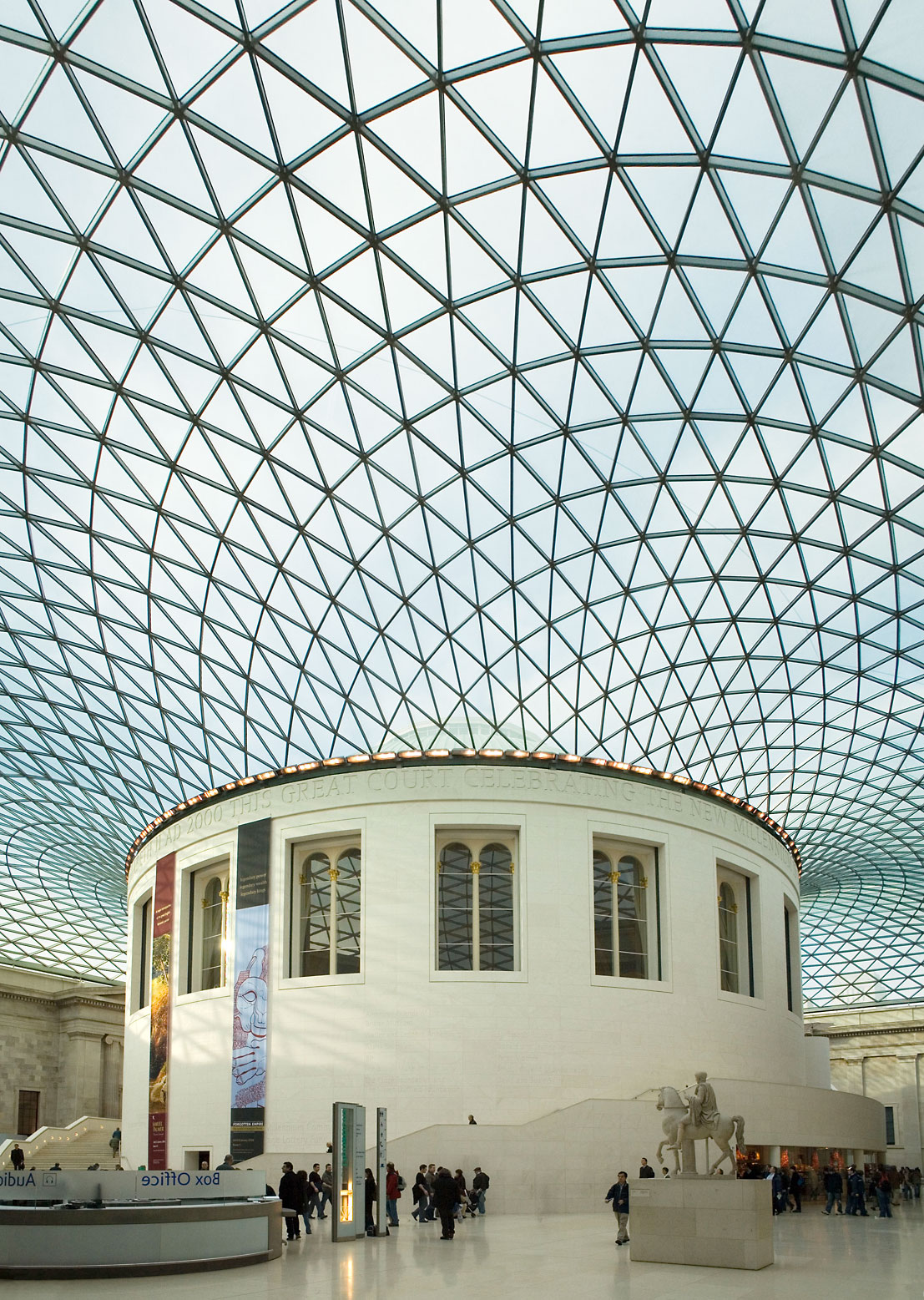
The tessellated glass roof of the British Museum's Great Court

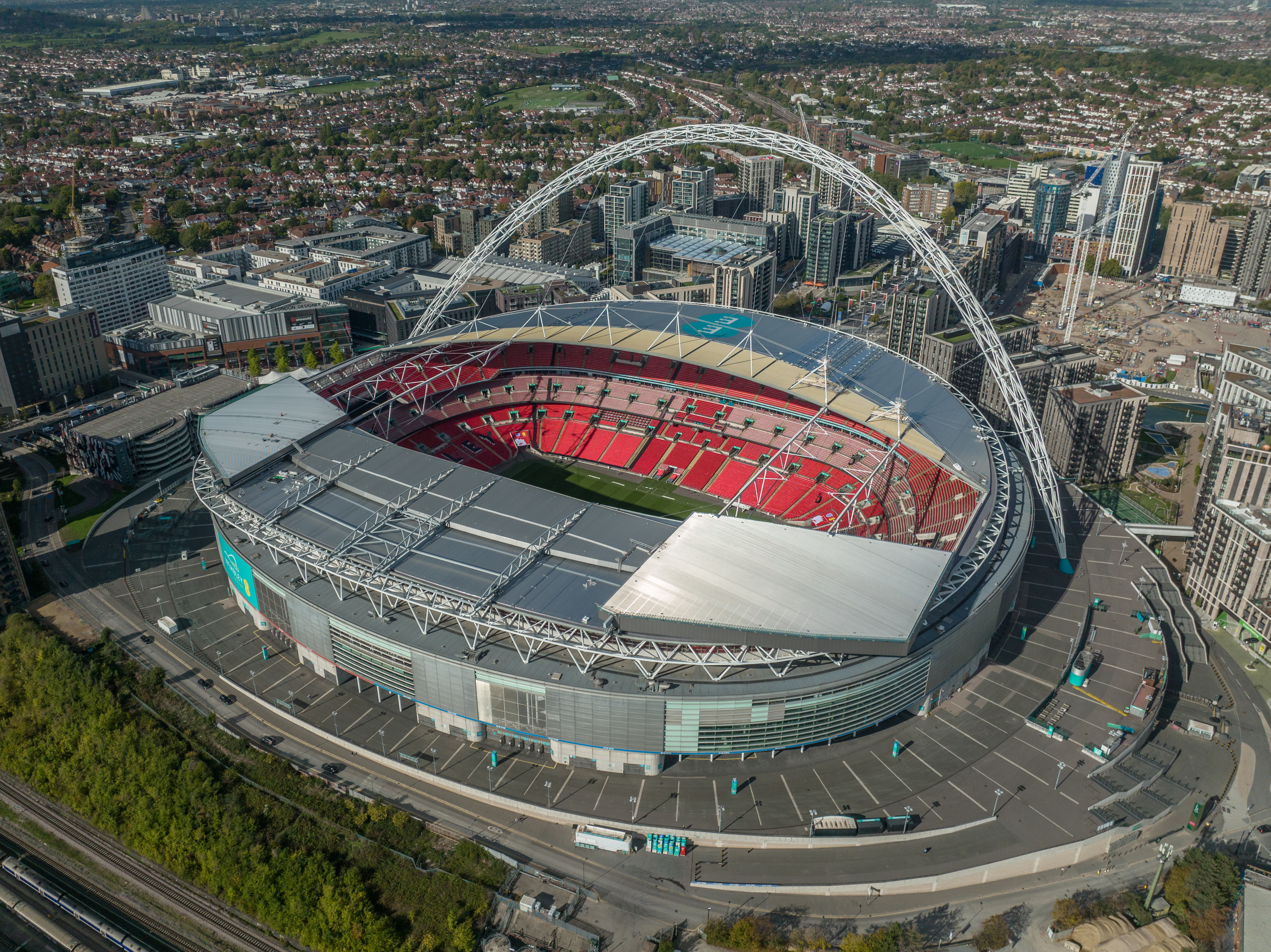
The new Wembley Stadium in London: one of the most controversial projects that Foster + Partners have been involved in.

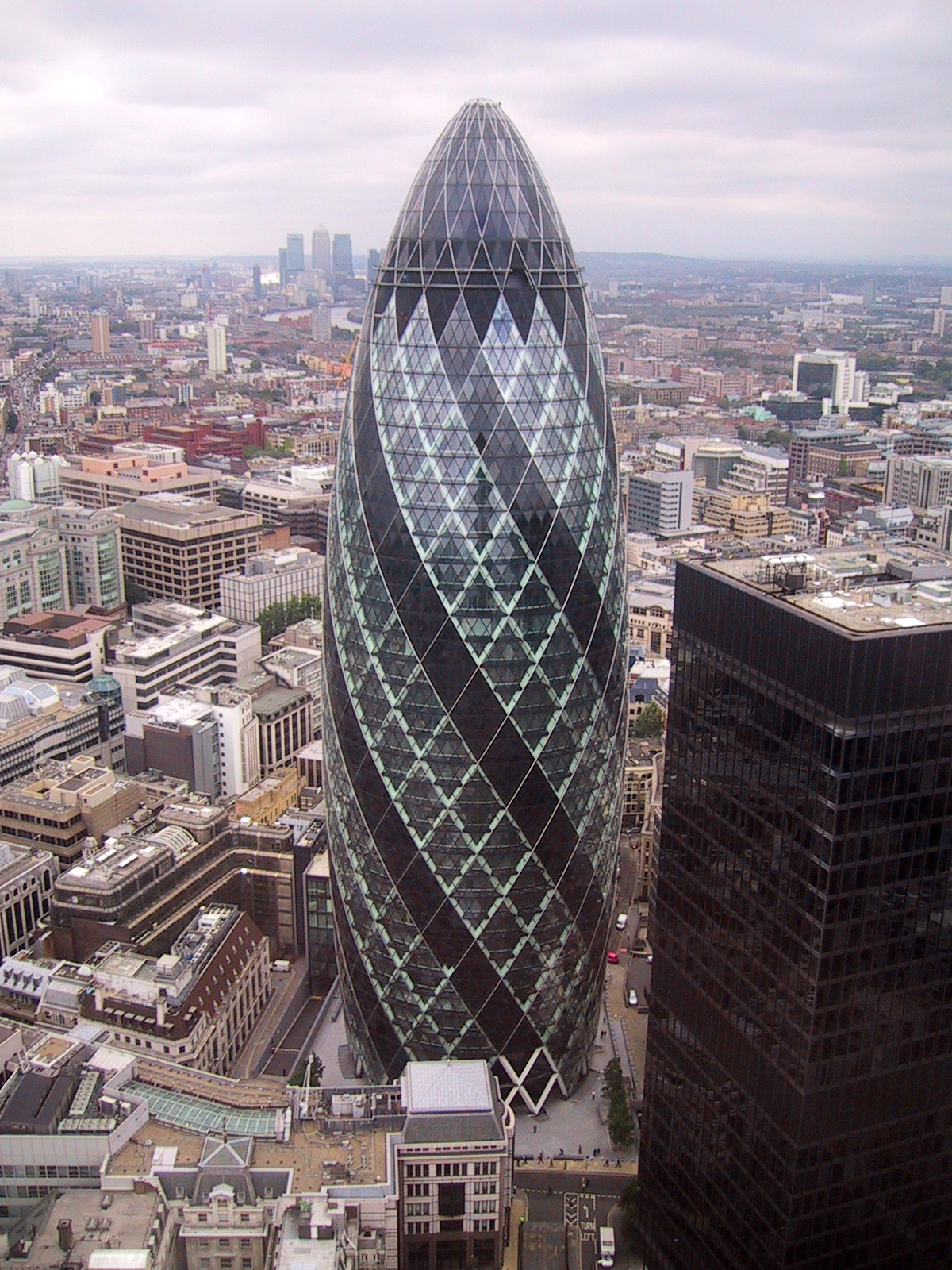
30 St Mary Axe, one of London's most popular new buildings

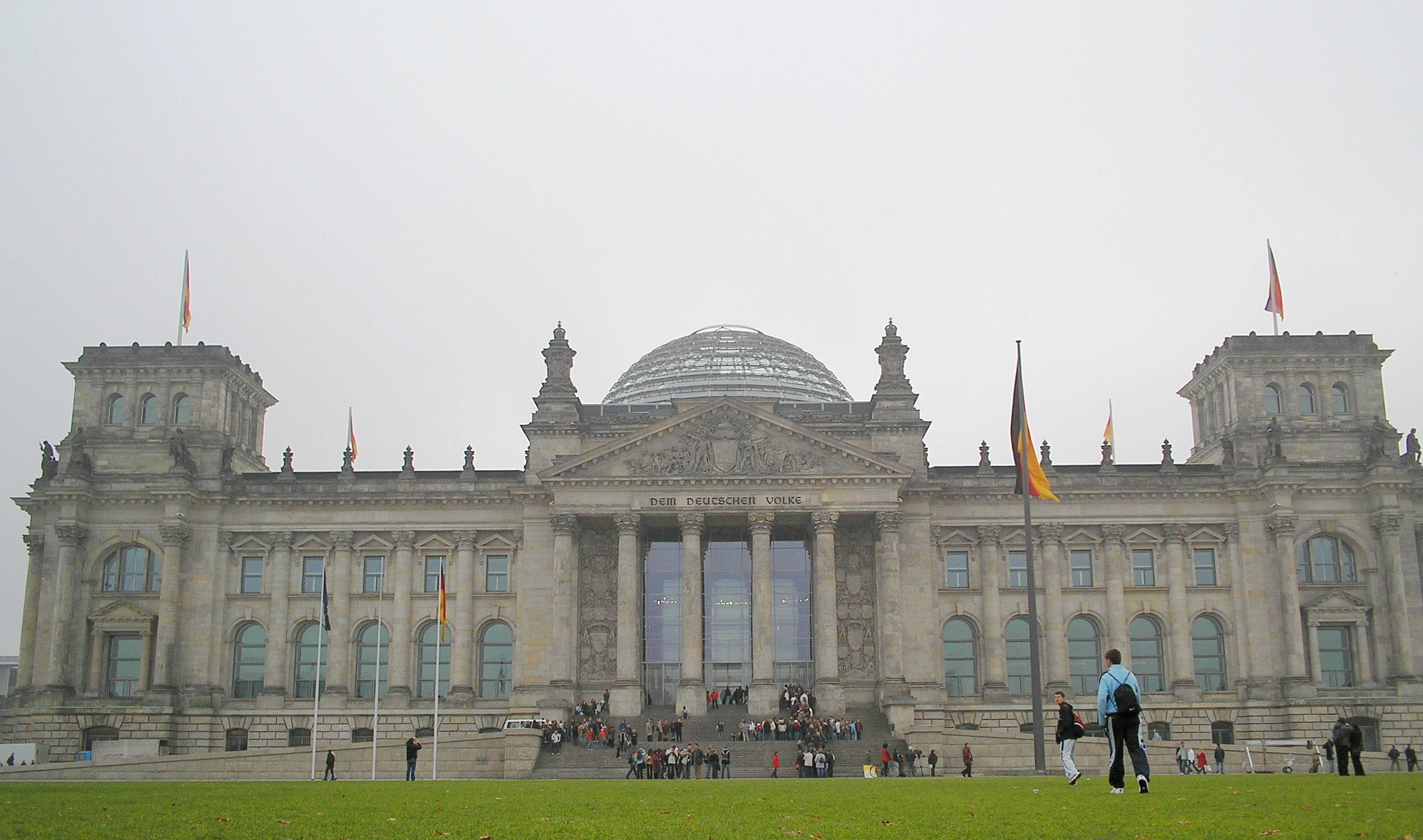
The reconstruction of the Reichstag building

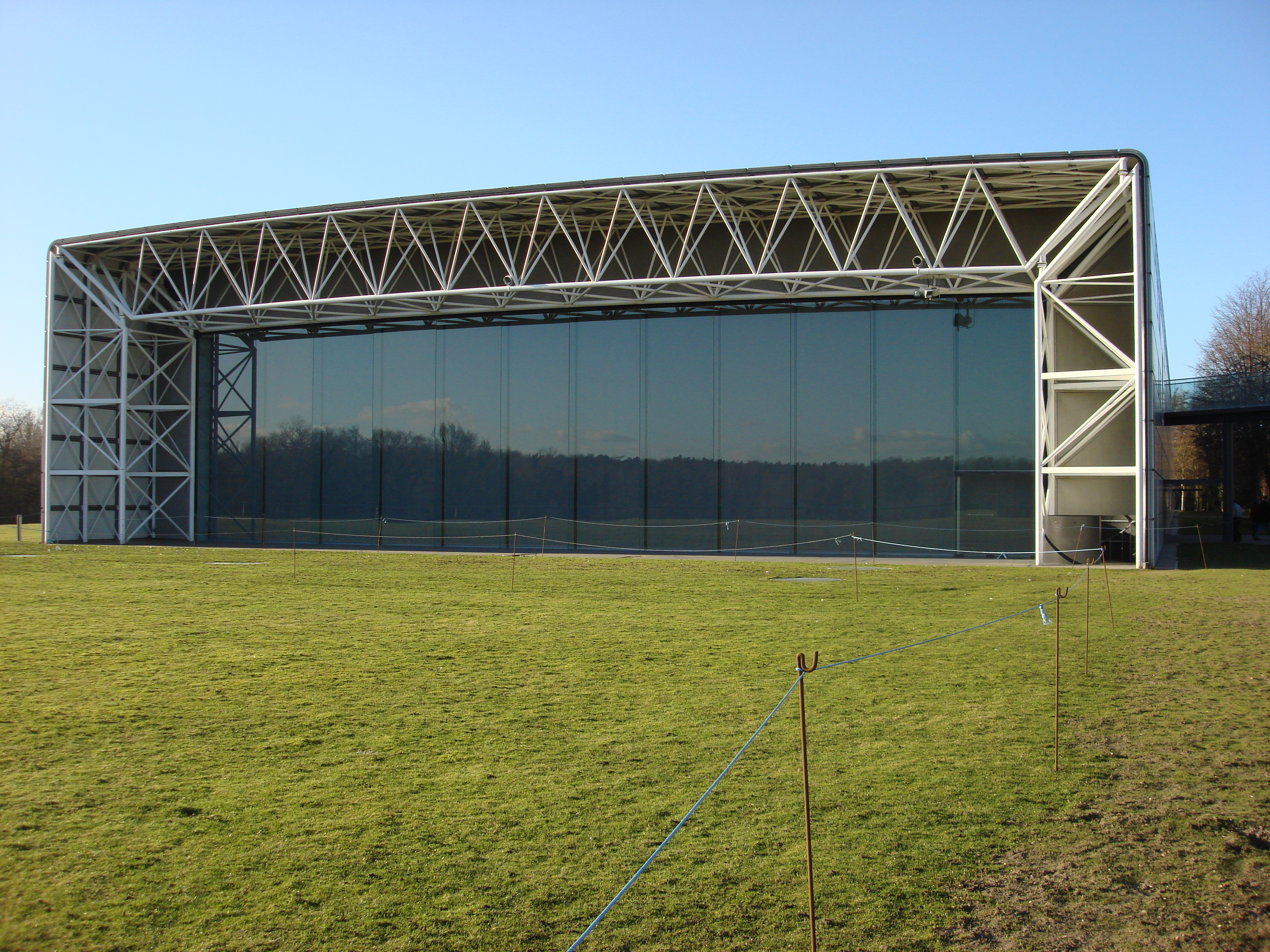
Sainsbury Centre for Visual Arts

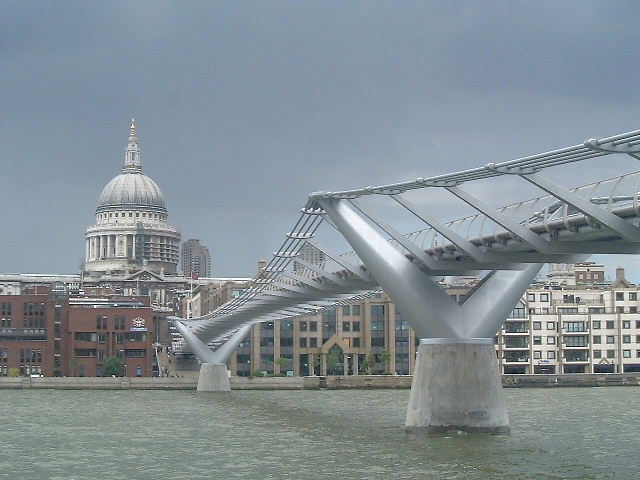
Millennium Bridge, London

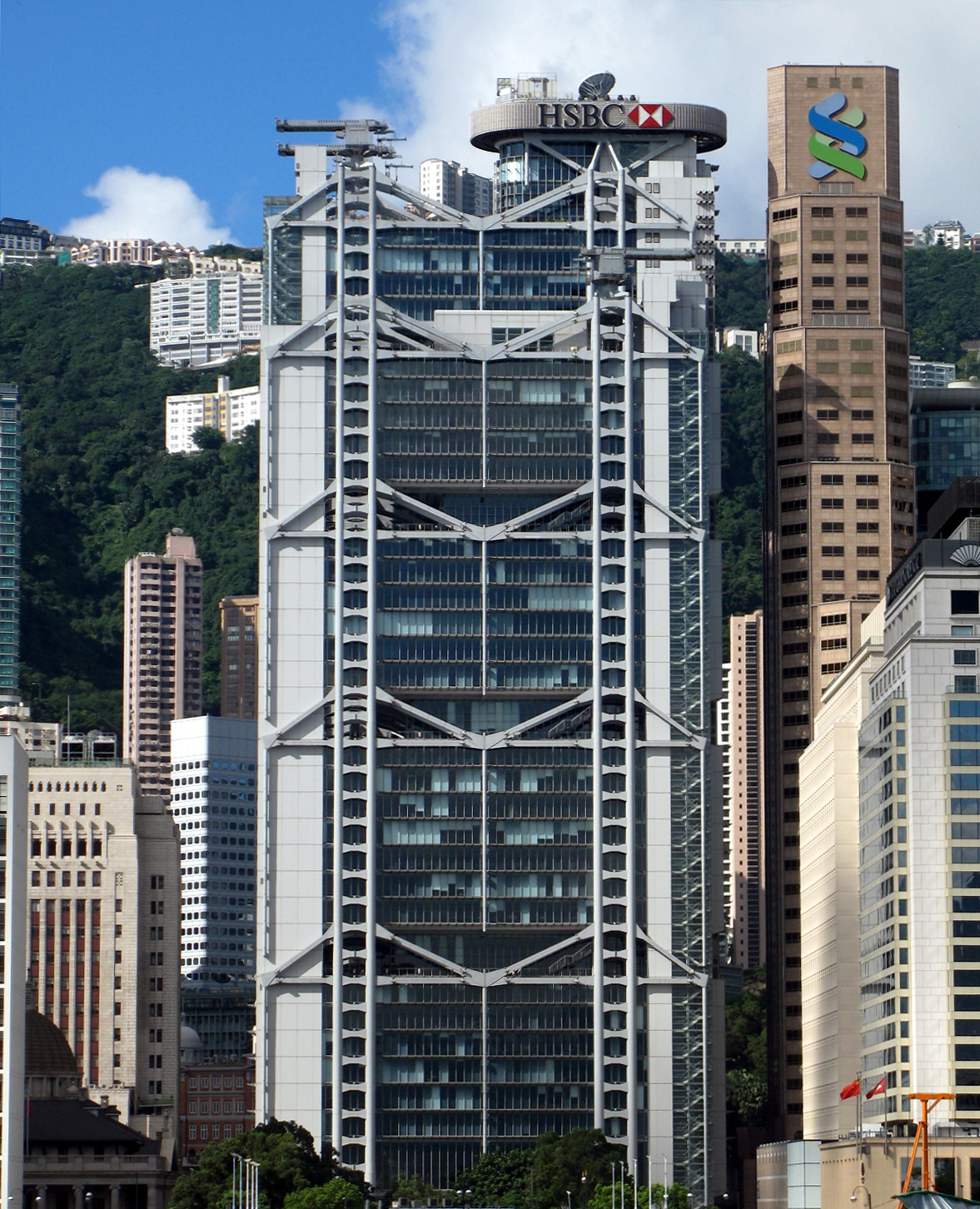
HSBC building in Hong Kong

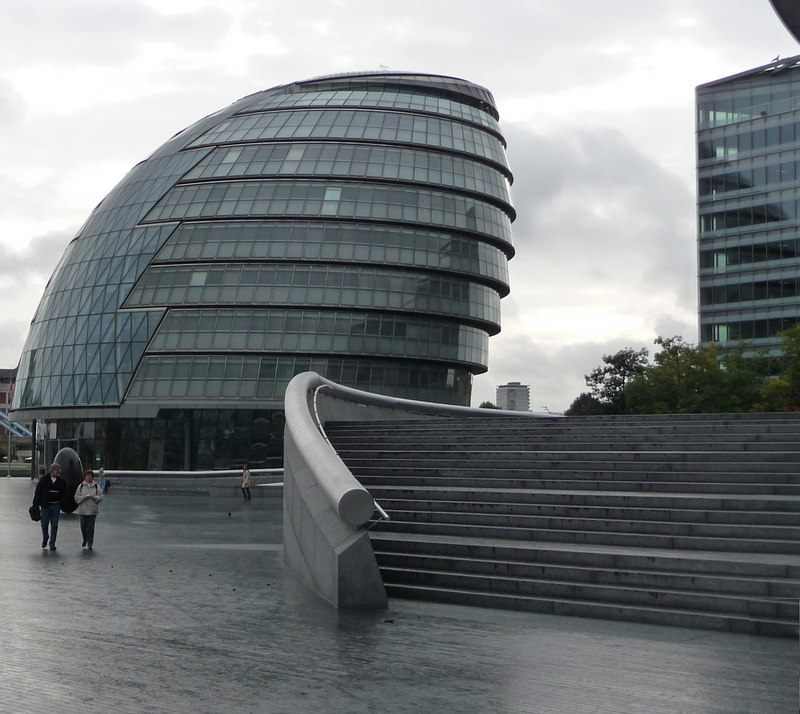
London City Hall

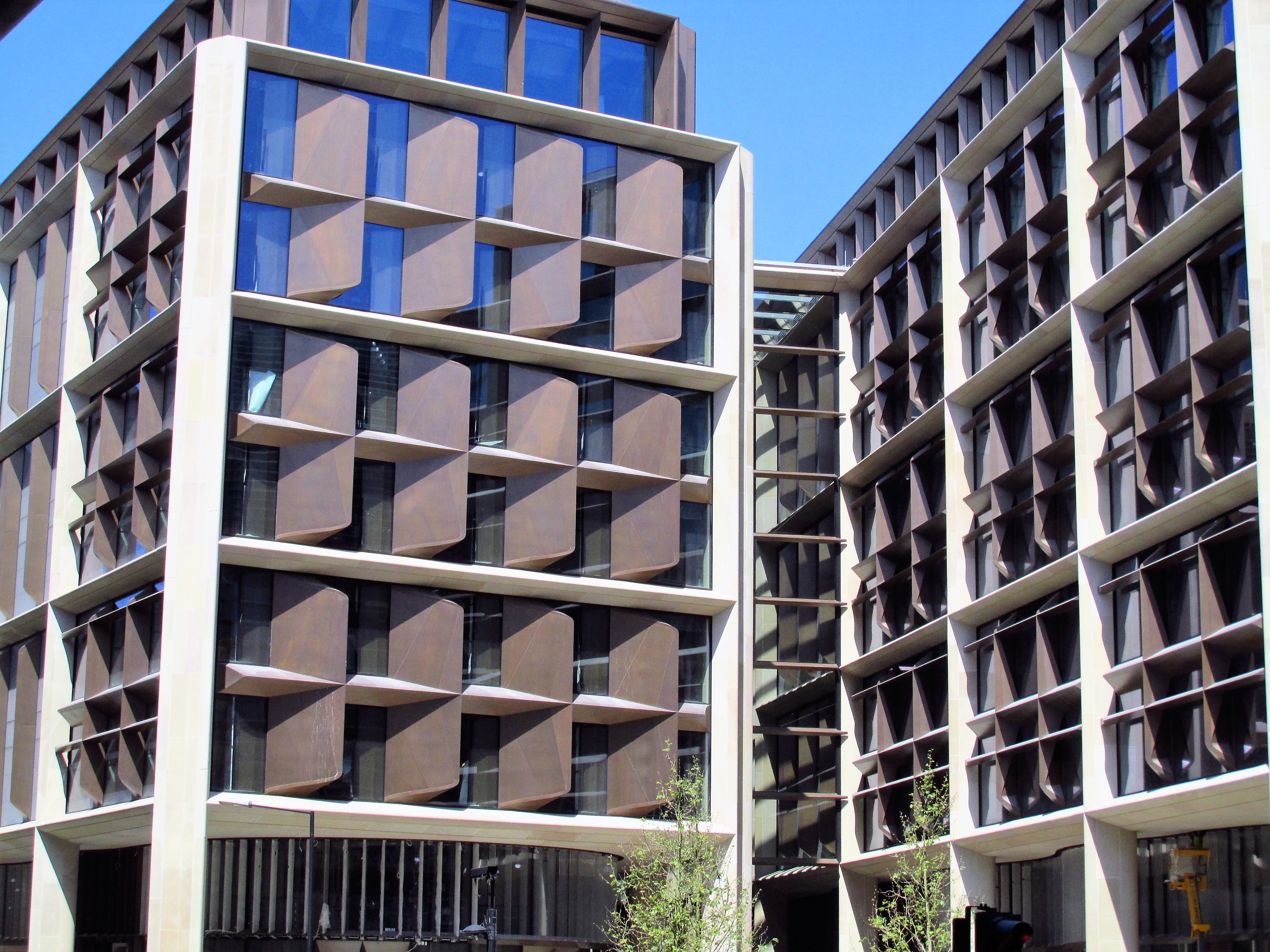
Bloomberg European Headquarters, London

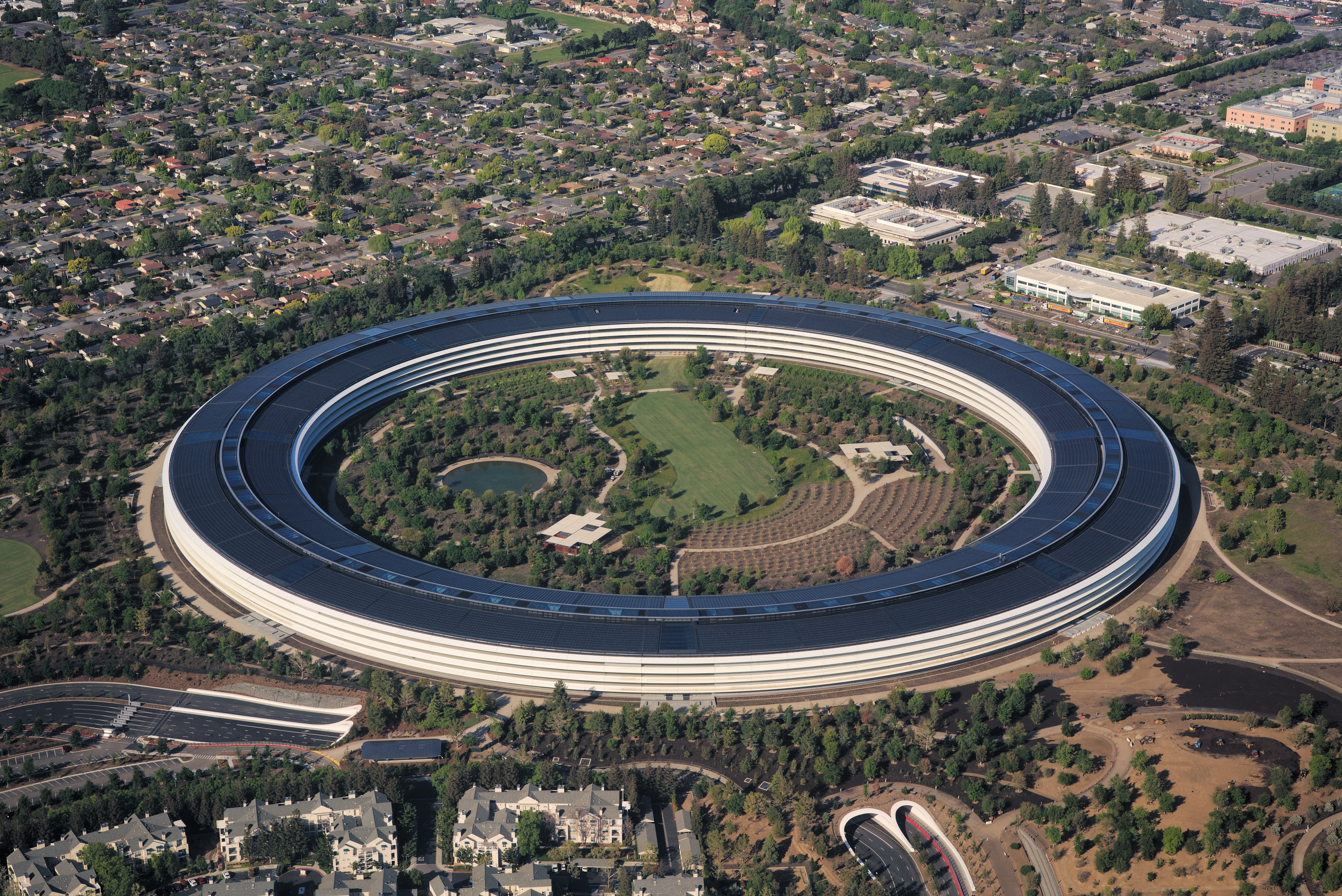
Apple Park

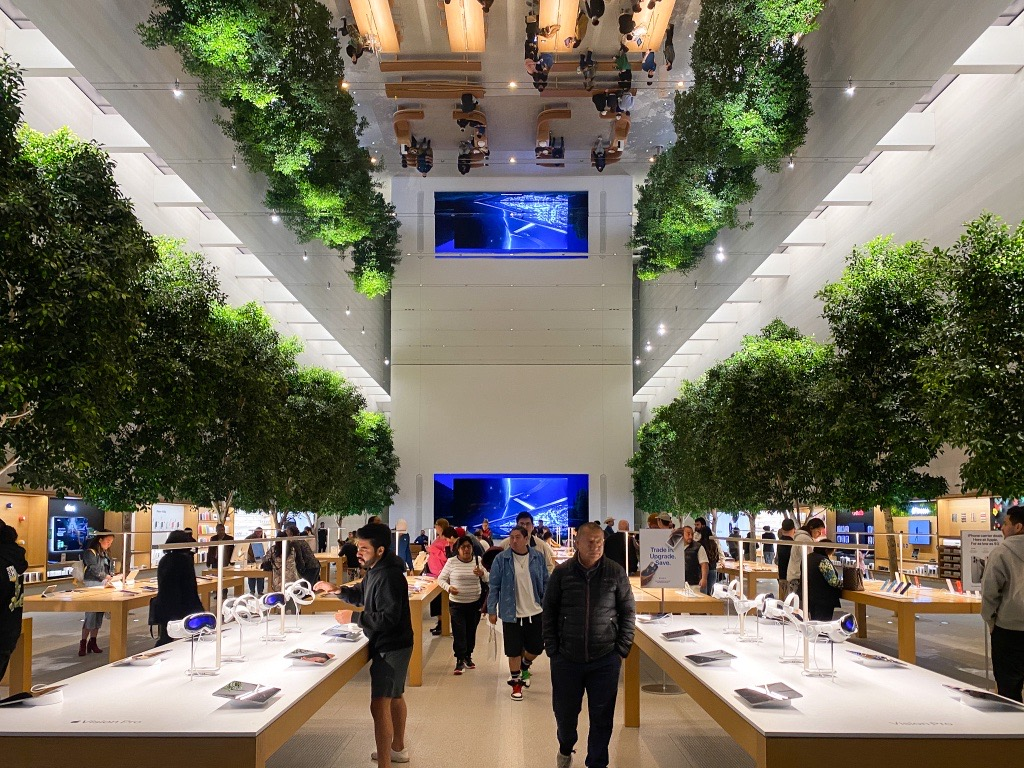
Interior of the Apple Store in Los Angeles, California

== Awards ==
- 1998 RIBA Stirling Prize for Imperial War Museum
- 2000 Welsh National Eisteddfod Gold Medal for the Great Glasshouse, National Botanic Garden of Wales
- 2003 MIPIM AR Future Projects Award, Grand Prix for Swiss Re
- 2004 RIBA Stirling Prize for Swiss Re
- 2007 RIBA European Award for Dresden Station Redevelopment
- 2007 RIBA International Award for Hearst Tower
- 2007 Aga Khan Award for Architecture for University of Technology Petronas
- 2008 2008 LEAF Award for Beijing Airport Terminal 3
- 2009 RIBA European Award for Zenith
- 2009 2009 RIBA International Award for Beijing Airport Terminal 3
- In June 2011, The Index Tower was the recipient of the 2011 Best Tall Building Middle East & Africa award by the Council on Tall Buildings and Urban Habitat
- 2010 RIBA International Award for Winspear Opera House
- 2011 RIBA International Award for Masdar Institute
- 2011 RIBA International Award for Boston Museum of Fine Arts
- 2013 RIBA International Award for Faena Aleph Residences
- 2013 RIBA International Award Central Market Project
- 2013 RIBA Award 7 More London More London
- 2013 Best Bar, Restaurant & Bar Design Awards for Atrium Champagne Bar, London, UK
- 2014 RIBA International Award for Marseille Vieux Port
- 2016 RIBA International Award for Buenos Aires Ciudad Casa de Gobierno
- 2017 RIBA National Award for Maggie's at the Robert Parfett Building
- 2018 RIBA Awards for International Excellence for Xiao Jing Wan University
- 2018 Stirling Prize for Bloomberg London, UK
- World Winners Prix Versailles 2018

== Criticism ==
In June 2008, The Guardian criticized real estate development in a pristine seacoast area in Bulgaria, which was under EU environmental protection. The paper cited environmentalists' concerns over the impact of the planned 15,000-inhabitant resort facilities. The Bulgarian partner Georgi Stanishev, is the brother of Sergey Stanishev, who served as the Prime Minister of Bulgaria between 2005 and 2009 and is also the Leader of the Bulgarian Socialist Party.

== Tallest buildings ==
This list ranks buildings which stand over 750 ft (230 m) tall that are designed by Foster + Partners. Spires and other architectural details are included in the height of a building, however, antennas are excluded.

In order for a building to be in this list, the building itself must have been designed or partially designed by Foster + Partners. Due to this, buildings such as the Transamerica Pyramid and 383 Madison Avenue are not included in this list.

Building has been architecturally topped out

Rank	Name	Image	City	Height	Floors	Year	Purpose	Notes
1	270 Park Avenue	DSC 3104 270 Park Avenue Lit Up With Union Jack	Flag_of_the_United_States New York City, United States	1,388 ft (423 m)	60	2025	Office	Headquarters for JPMorgan Chase.
2	China Merchants Bank Tower Global HQ	SHENZHEN_TALENTS_PARK_(26)	Flag_of_the_People's_Republic_of_China Shenzhen, China	1,273 ft (388 m)	77	2025	Office	
3	Burj Mohammed Bin Rashid	13-08-06-abu-dhabi-by-RalfR-099	Flag_of_the_United_Arab_Emirates Abu Dhabi, United Arab Emirates	1,251 ft (381 m)	88	2014	Residential	
4	Comcast Technology Center	Comcast_Technology_Center_f	Flag_of_the_United_States Philadelphia, United States	1,121 ft (342 m)	59	2018	Hotel, Office	
5	Yuexiu Global Financial Center		Flag_of_the_People's_Republic_of_China Wuhan, China	1,083 ft (330 m)	68	2025	Office	
6	The Index	The_Index_Tower_-_panoramio	Flag_of_the_United_Arab_Emirates Dubai, United Arab Emirates	1,070 ft (330 m)	80	2010	Office, Residential	
7	Varso	Varso,_July_2024	Flag_of_Poland Warsaw, Poland	1,017 ft (310 m)	53	2022	Office	
8	Lusail Plaza Tower 4	Artists_rendering_of_Lusail_Towers_and_Commercial_Boulevard_in_the_center	Flag_of_Qatar Doha, Qatar	986 ft (301 m)	66	2023	Office	
9	Lusail Plaza Tower 3	Artists_rendering_of_Lusail_Towers_and_Commercial_Boulevard_in_the_center	Flag_of_Qatar Doha, Qatar	986 ft (301 m)	66	2023	Office	
10	NBK Tower	NBK Tower Kuwait City Skyline 2 (cropped)	Flag_of_Kuwait Kuwait City, Kuwait	984 ft (300 m)	61	2019	Office	
11	50 Hudson Yards	50_Hudson_Yards	Flag_of_the_United_States New York City, United States	981 ft (299 m)	58	2022	Office	
N/A	Torre de Collserola	Torre_de_Collserola_from_Tibidabo	Flag_of_Spain Barcelona, Spain	945 ft (288 m)	13	1992	Telecommunications, Observation Tower	
12	ICD Brookfield Place		Flag_of_the_United_Arab_Emirates Dubai, United Arab Emirates	916 ft (279 m)	54	2020	Office	
13	Trust Tower	Trust_Tower_Abu_Dhabi_001	Flag_of_the_United_Arab_Emirates Abu Dhabi, United Arab Emirates	907 ft (276 m)	60	2014	Office	
14	Ilham Tower	Ilham_tower	Flag_of_Malaysia Kuala Lumpur, Malaysia	899 ft (274 m)	58	2015	Office, Residential	
15	Al Faisaliah Tower	King_Fahd_Road_(looking_north)	Flag_of_Saudi_Arabia Riyadh, Saudi Arabia	876 ft (267 m)	44	2000	Office, Hotel	
16	Salesforce Tower	AUS_Sydney,_Central_Business_District,_Sydney_Harbour_Bridge,_View_008	Flag_of_Australia_(WFB_2014) Sydney, Australia	863 ft (263 m)	56	2022	Office	
17	425 Park Avenue	425_park_avenue_southwest_corner	Flag_of_the_United_States New York City, United States	860 ft (260 m)	41	2021	Office	
18	Commerzbank Tower	Frankfurt_Am_Main-Commerzbank_Tower_vom_Rathenauplatz-20100808	Flag_of_Germany Frankfurt, Germany	850 ft (260 m)	56	1997	Office	
19	Torre Cepsa	Torre_Cepsa_(Madrid)_01	Flag_of_Spain Madrid, Spain	815 ft (248 m)	49	2008	Office	
20	Emaar Square The Address Hotel & Residences	Emaar Address Hotel Istanbul	Flag_of_Turkey Istanbul, Türkiye	802 ft (244 m)	51	2020	Hotel, Residential	
21	Deutsche Bank Place	Deutsche_Bank_Place	Flag_of_Australia_(WFB_2014) Sydney, Australia	787 ft (240 m)	39	2005	Office	
22	The Bow	The_Bow,_Calgary,_east_view_20240819_1	Flag_of_Canada_(Pantone) Calgary, Canada	784 ft (239 m)	57	2012	Office	
23	Samba Bank HQ Tower		Flag_of_Saudi_Arabia Riyadh, Saudi Arabia	758 ft (231 m)	40	2020	Office	

== See also ==
- List of architecture firms
- List of architects
- Mouzhan Majidi
- Richard Rogers
- Roy Fleetwood
- SkyCycle (proposed transport project)
