= SkyCycle (proposed transport project) =

Unrealised transport infrastructure proposal for London

The developers' architectural rendering of part of the SkyCycle network

SkyCycle was a proposed transport infrastructure project for London of a 219-kilometre (136 mi) network of elevated cycle paths above train tracks. The routes would have had a width of up to 15 metres (49 ft), and be accessed by over 200 ramps throughout the city, subject to a toll of £1. The developers of the project estimated that the cycle paths would accommodate 400,000 riders during rush hour and shave 30 minutes off current travel time. If the project became a reality, its construction was estimated to take over 20 years. The project was the creation of landscape architects Exterior Architecture and Space Syntax, with whom Norman Foster of Foster and Partners had been working since 2012. The proposals were welcomed by Network Rail.

== History ==
The idea for the project originated in 2011 with Sam Martin, the director of Exterior Architecture, and his employee Oli Clark. Clark had proposed a network of elevated cycle routes around Battersea Power Station for his student dissertation. Following email communication with the office of the Mayor of London, Boris Johnson, Clark and Martin had a meeting with Isabel Dedring, the Deputy Mayor for Transport, incidentally encountering Johnson himself on their way to it, who was enthusiastic upon being told about the project. Dedring then arranged meetings with Dave Ward, the executive director of Network Rail. Dedring and Ward suggested that the group design an initial phase of the network, following the 6.5-kilometre (4.0 mi) route of the Great Eastern Main Line between Stratford station and Liverpool Street station. Martin approached Foster and Partners for planning assistance. The group estimated the cost of the first phase as £220 million, and the cost of the entire project between £7 and 8 billion. In October 2012, the proposal was rejected by Johnson, following a meeting of representatives of Network Rail and Transport for London, who had expressed concerns that estimated costs for the project had not been fully worked out and that London did not have sufficient railway capacity to build on. In 2014 the developers were said to be seeking funds for a feasibility study.

== Reception ==
The cycling charity CTC expressed concern over the wind exposure that riders would face when using SkyCycle, as well as the steepness of the ramps. Wired called the project "amazing". ArchDaily said the project would divert resources away from more important projects and have some negative consequences. BBC News called it a "radical solution to protect cyclists".

== See also ==
- Cycling in London
- List of cycle routes in London
