= Four Twenty Five =

Restaurant in Manhattan, New York, U.S.

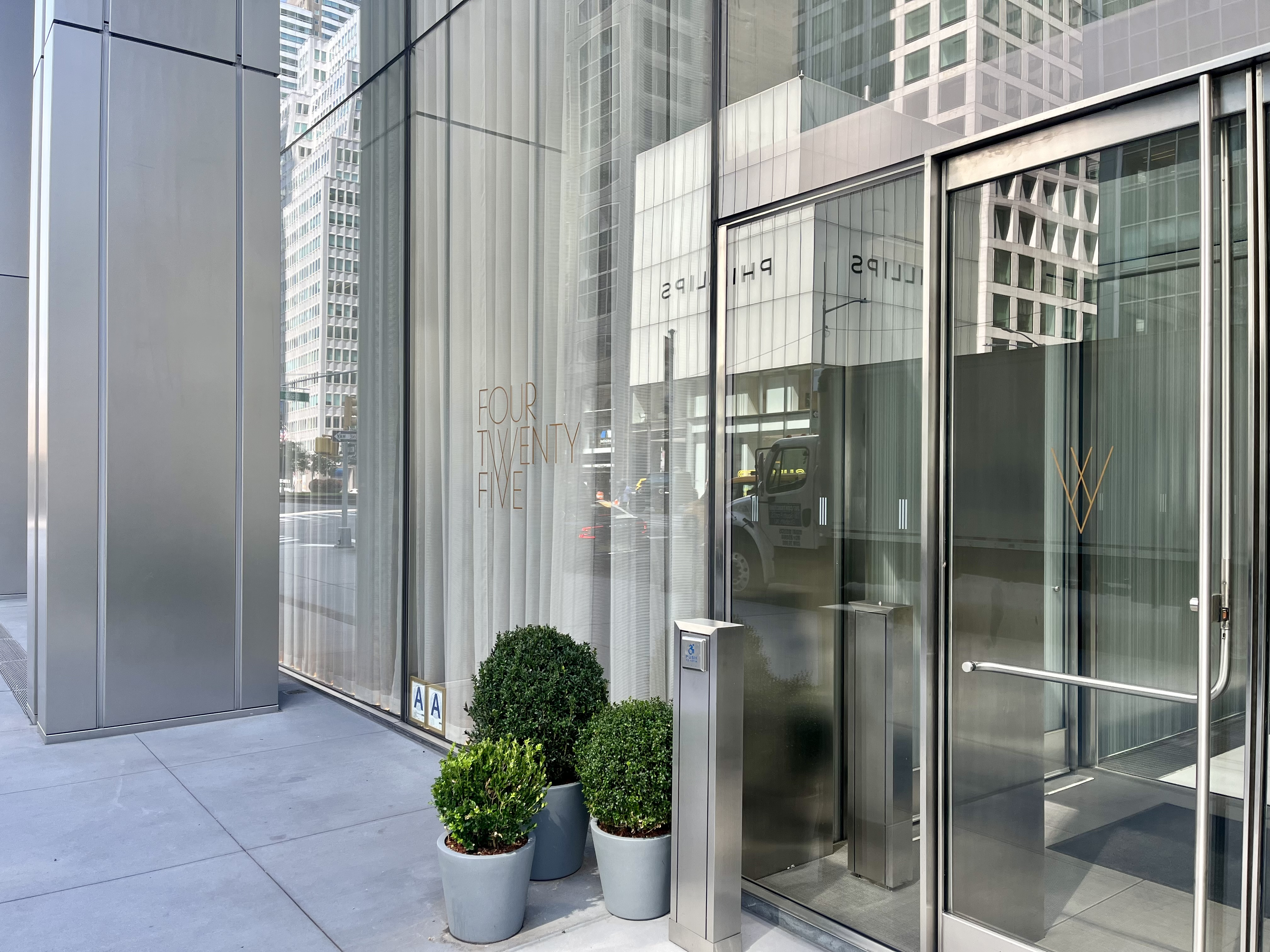
- The restaurant's exterior in 2024
- Interactive map of Four Twenty Five

Restaurant information
- Established: December 2023
- Location: 425 Park Avenue, New York City, New York, 10022, United States
- Coordinates: 40°45′38″N 73°58′16″W

Four Twenty Five is a restaurant in Midtown Manhattan, New York City. It opened in December 2023 and is located in 425 Park Avenue.

== Description ==
The menu includes chicken with in black truffle breadcrumbs and black bass with winter mushrooms.
