= 425 Park Avenue =

Skyscraper in Manhattan, New York

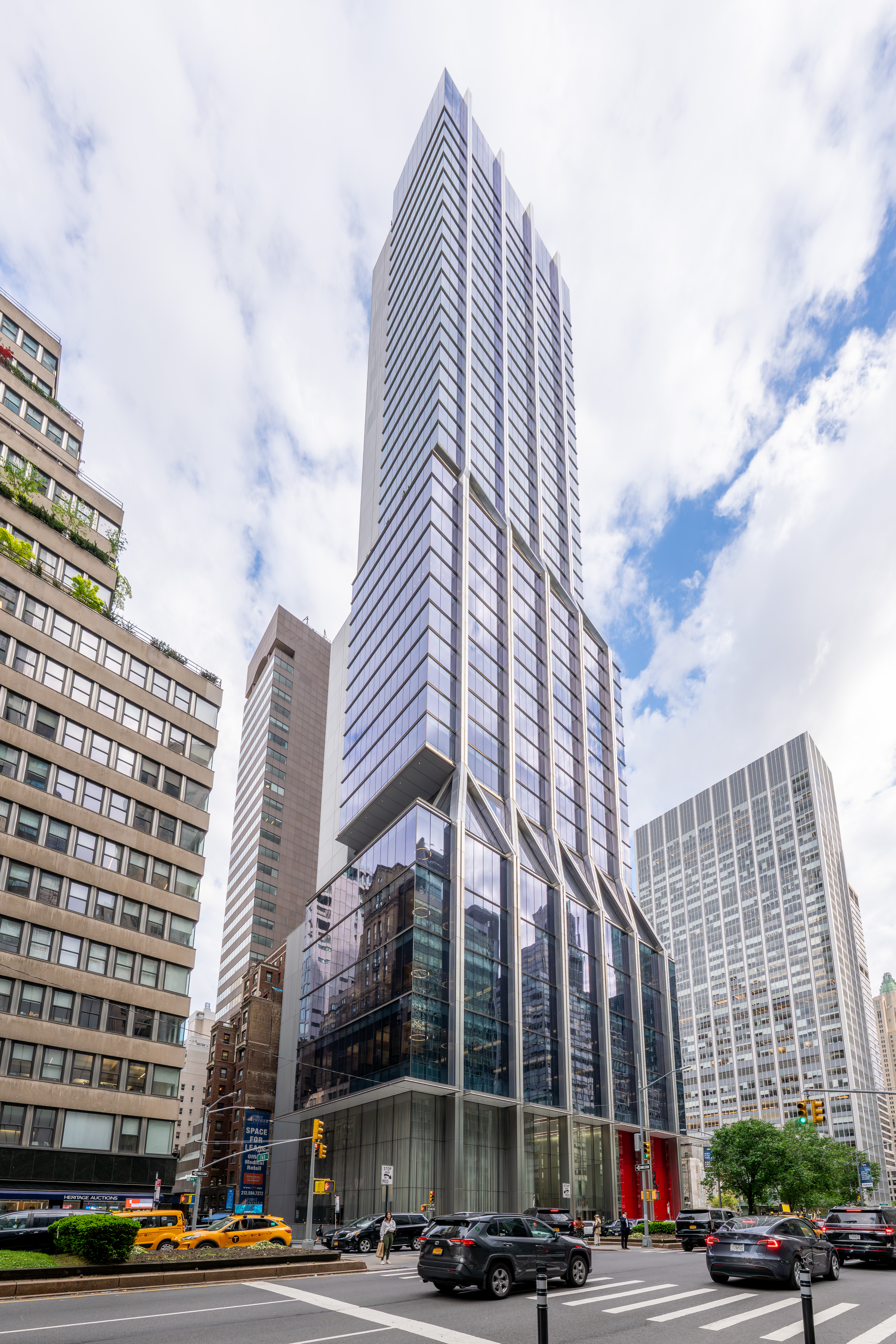
- (2026)
- Interactive map of the 425 Park Avenue area

General information
- Status: Completed
- Type: Office
- Location: 425 Park Avenue, Manhattan, New York City, United States
- Coordinates: 40.760542°N 73.971157°W
- Construction started: 2016
- Topped-out: December 4, 2018
- Completed: October 2022
- Cost: $1 billion

Height
- Height: 860 feet (262.1 m)

Technical details
- Floor area: 670,000 square feet (62,000 m^{2})

Design and construction
- Architects: Foster + Partners, AAI Architects, P.C. (as architect of record)

425 Park Avenue is an office building in New York City redeveloped by L&L Holding and GreenOak Real Estate, with a design by architectural firm Foster + Partners. Work on the new structure began in 2016, and the building was completed in October 2022.

== Architecture ==
=== Original building ===
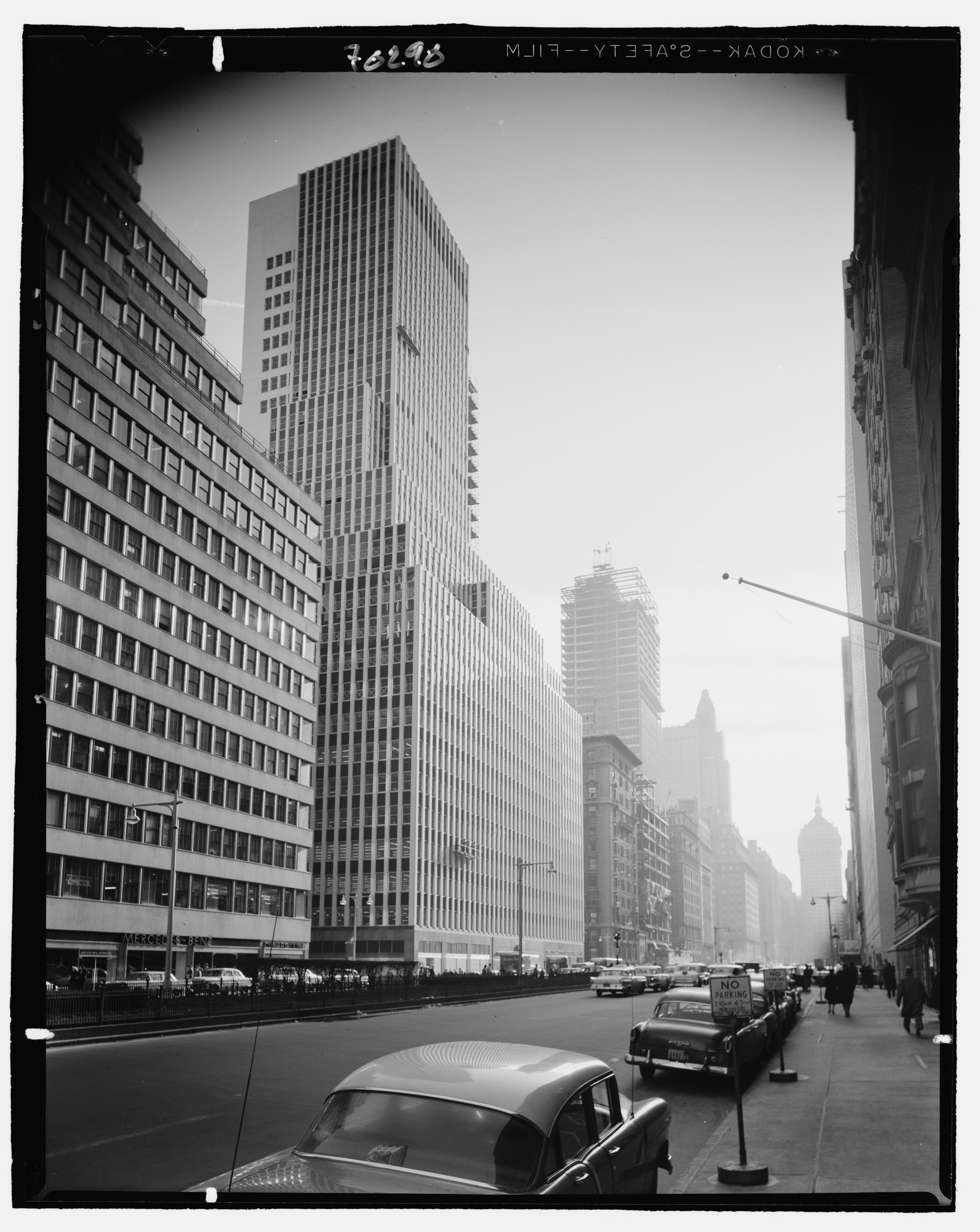
The original 425 Park Avenue

The original 388-foot (118 m) building was designed by Kahn & Jacobs. Modernist in style, it replaced a row of sixteen four-story townhouses built by Robert Goelet in 1871. The construction of the building began in 1954, on land leased from the Robert Walton Goelet estate, who died in 1941. At the time of the construction, it was one of the tallest buildings that utilized bolted connections. The 32-story building was open in 1957 with National Biscuit Company, Kaye Scholer, Chemical Corn Exchange Bank as major tenants.

Since 2004, L&L Holding, which was founded in 2000, had been trying to redevelop 425 Park Avenue when the Goelet family intended to sell a 33% stake of the property. After an extended negotiation, L&L, in partnership with Lehman Brothers, entered into an 84-year ground lease deal with the Goelet family in 2006 that was valued at $320 million with a large upfront payment. The lease allowed L&L to redevelop the easterly block of Park Avenue between 55th and 56th streets after the existing leases with the building tenants expired in 2015. During the predevelopment phase, Lehman Brothers went into bankruptcy in 2008. L&L attempted to buy Lehman Brothers out at a steep discount, but Lehman Brothers opted to continue funding the project through its bankruptcy with the original financial obligations. However, in 2013, L&L, GreenOak Real Estate, and other investors bought 90% of Lehman Brothers’ stake in the project, allowing L&L to have full control of the redevelopment.

=== Redesigned building ===
L&L designed the new building under the assumption that it would keep 25% of its former structure in order to keep the total floor area of 670,000 sq ft (62,000 m^{2}). L&L chose Foster + Partners to design the building after a competition to choose an architect. L&L solicited bids from 11 architectural firms. These entries were narrowed to four final proposals, from Zaha Hadid Architects, Rogers Stirk Harbour + Partners, OMA, and Foster + Partners. Each incorporated a portion of the original structure. Real estate news site YIMBY noted that, due to its three roughly 200 ft (61 m) concrete fins, the Foster plan would have "[...] the most pronounced skyline effect" compared to the other proposals. Another key element of Foster + Partners design was the three tiers of very high ceiling and virtually column-free floor space.

== Zoning ==
425 Park Avenue is located in the eastern part of Midtown Manhattan. The area, from approximately East 34th Street to East 59th Street, and from Second Avenue to Fifth Avenue, is one of the main business districts in Manhattan with more than 400 office buildings.

The 1961 Zoning Resolution restricted the size of buildings based on floor area ratio (FAR), not height. As many as 300 office buildings in the area were built before 1961 with an average age of 73 years. The older building stock made the area less competitive in the modern office space market due to low ceilings and less open floor space by the obstruction of many columns in those buildings. The 1961 zoning was more restrictive than prior rules with low allowable FAR to make the area less dense. Many of those pre-1961 office buildings were considered overbuilt as the floor areas exceeded the area allowed by the 1961 zoning, but they were grandfathered in. If the owners of those buildings were to have demolished an existing building to build a new one on the site, the new building would have had less floor space than the original one. This deterred redevelopment of those older office buildings. The concern was the reason for the city's East Midtown rezoning plan, which added more air rights in the neighborhood immediately around Grand Central Terminal, thereby encouraging redevelopment.

For 425 Park Avenue, without the redevelopment, the building could only generate revenue of about $50 to $70 per square foot. With a more modern building, the revenue could be boosted to more than $100 per square foot. The 1961 zoning was a major obstacle for its redevelopment. If L&L would have demolished the building, it could only construct a building with the maximum of 580,000 sq ft (54,000 m^{2}) instead of the original 670,000 sq ft (62,000 m^{2}). However, there was an exception to the 1961 zoning rules. If a redevelopment of a pre-1961 building could retain at least 25% of its original structure, the new building would be permitted to have up to the original square footage. This was an option that L&L explored, but the rezoning occurred only after L&L had already commissioned a design.

== Development ==
A $556 million construction loan is secured by the property.

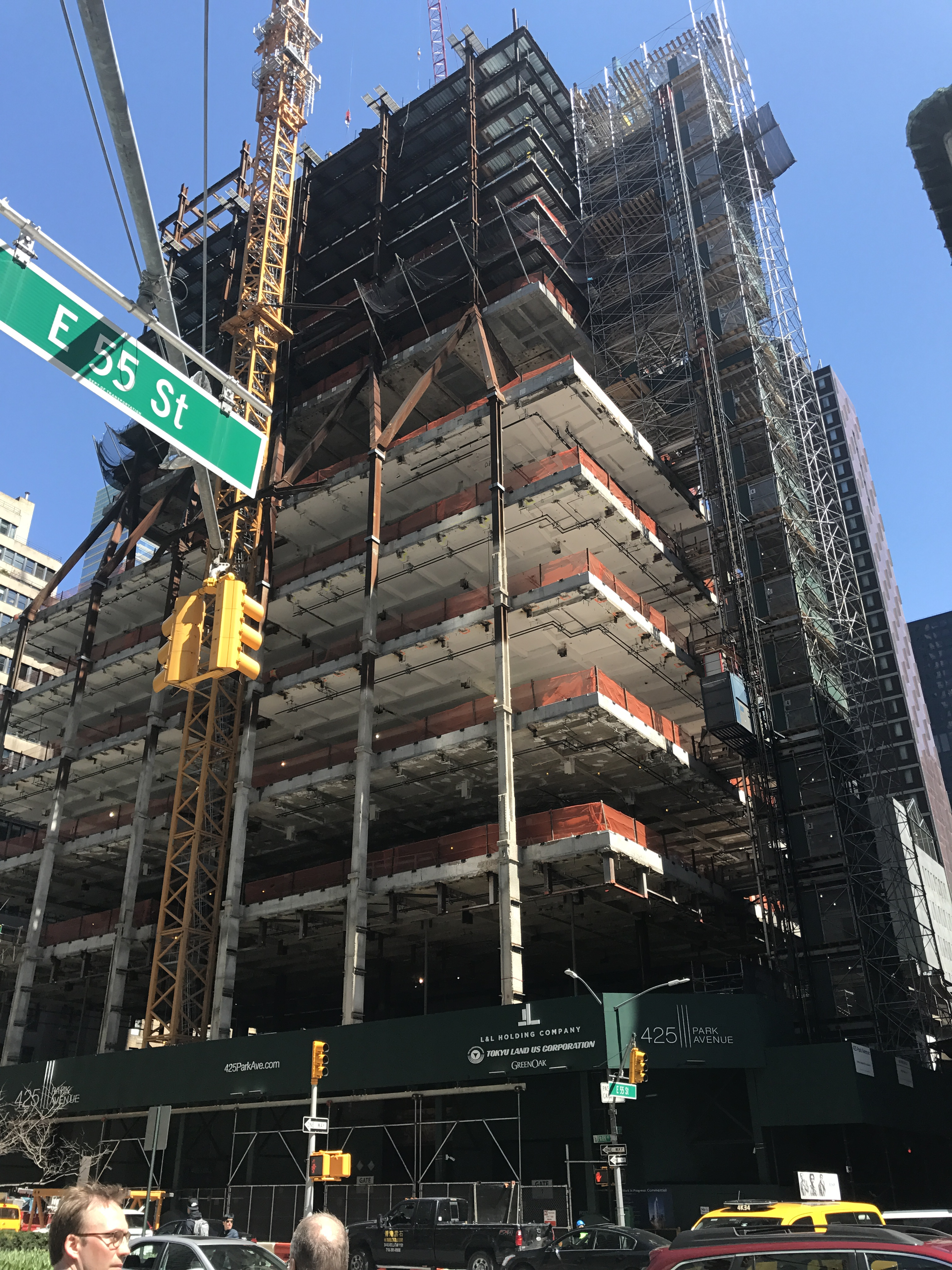
The new base with the floor slabs connected to the new columns, and the old columns cut off.

Preserving the original structure led to difficulties during construction, requiring the developer to hire a third engineering firm to help orchestrate the sequence of demolition and construction. The first step was to completely demolish floor by floor from the top floor to the 18th floor. Temporary steel structures were then installed to support the remaining 17 floors before further demolition. As much as 750 tons of wind bracings, crane-bracing systems, shoring systems and temporary trusses were put in place. Installing these large temporary steel structures in the middle of a partially demolished building proven to be a challenging and time-consuming process. After the installation, the rear side of the building was demolished. Twelve new jumbo columns were erected, six as exterior columns at the front of the building and the other six at the center of the building. The new building core was also built at the rear to connect to every other floor that would be remained in the new building. The rest of the unconnected floor slabs were demolished creating high ceiling floors at the base. The work continued on the building core at the rear, and new floors were built atop the old structure. There was a waiting period of many months when more floors were built upward before the removal of the original columns and the temporary steel structures at the base, leaving those floors to be supported by 12 jumbo columns and the new building core only.

The building reached half its full height in April 2018. Facade installation began in June 2018; at the time, the superstructure was 22 stories from topping out. The building topped out on December 4, 2018, in a ceremony attended by lead architect Lord Norman Foster. The building received a temporary Certificate of occupancy in January 2021. The renovation was completed in October 2022.

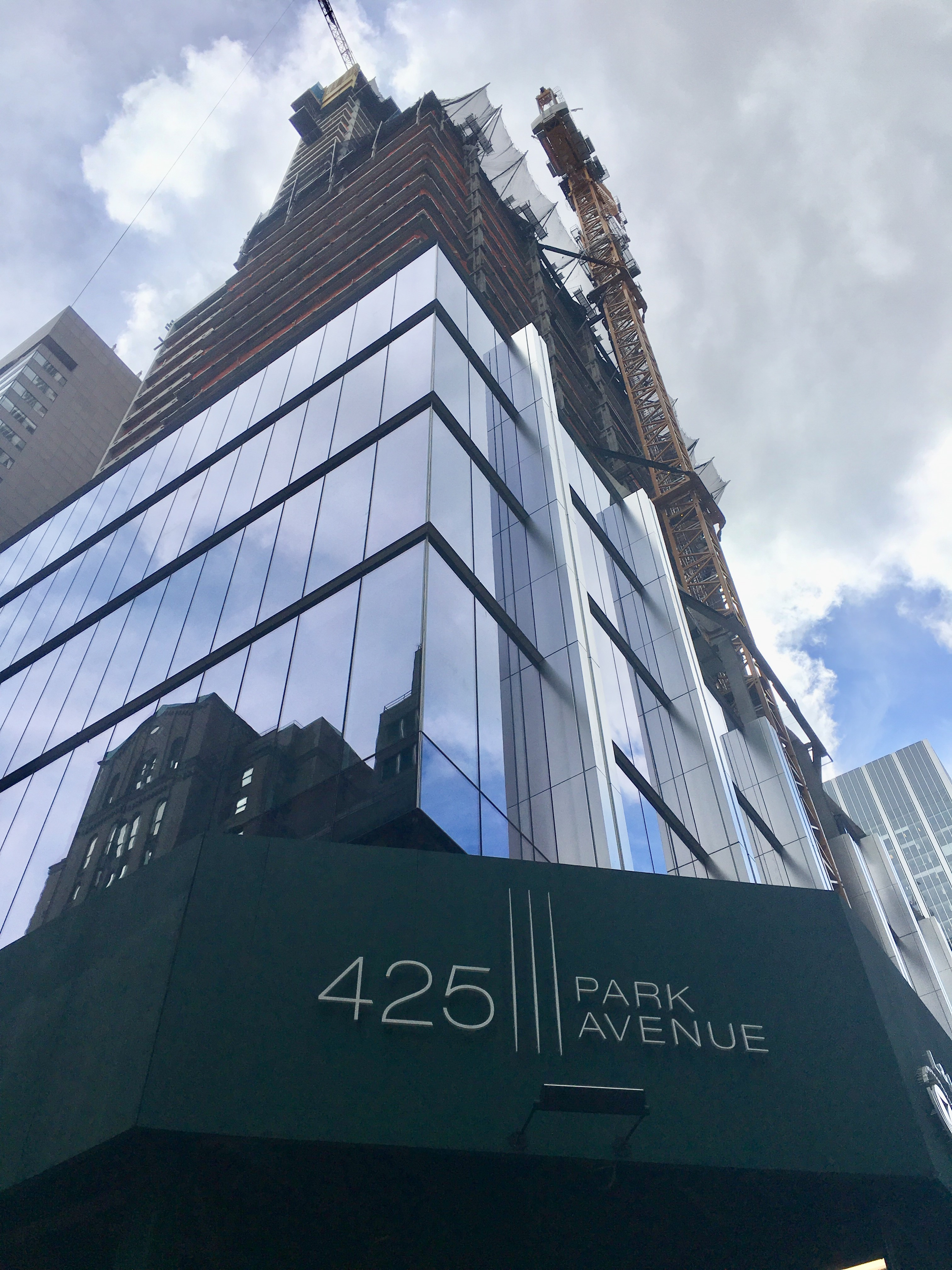
425 Park Avenue in September 2018

== Tenants ==
L&L intended not to pre-lease the building, but in early 2016, hedge fund Citadel signed a lease for 200,000 sq ft (19,000 m^{2}) across several floors, including the penthouse floor. At the time it was signed, it was the most expensive lease in the city's history. Delays in construction led some to speculate that Citadel may back out of the lease, or that it was seeking temporary offices due to the delays. L&L has asserted that the tenant will move in as planned. These concerns were officially allayed in January 2019 when Citadel executed a lease expansion for another 124,000 sq ft (11,500 m^{2}) of space, bringing their total occupancy to 16 floors of the building. The expansion will see Citadel occupy a total of 335,400 sq ft (31,160 m^{2}), or 48% of the building's space.

Daniel Humm, a founder of restaurant Eleven Madison Park, was originally contracted to open two restaurants in the building. One was to be two stories tall, in the building's base, totaling roughly 14,000 sq ft (1,300 m^{2}). According to L&L's founder, David Levinson, the intention was for the restaurant to be "[...] a Four Seasons on steroids for the 21st century". The other restaurant would have been open only to tenants, and would have been located on the 27th floor. In 2018, it was reported that despite construction delays, both venues were still expected to open upon the completion of construction. However, the plans for Humm's restaurant were cancelled in 2022 due to his pivot to serving exclusively vegan food at his restaurants. In August 2022, it was reported by the New York Post that Jean-Georges Vongerichten would replace Humm, opening a large restaurant in the building's base and a tenant-only restaurant. Four Twenty Five, a restaurant by Jean-Georges Vongerichten, opened in the building in December 2023.

== See also ==
- List of tallest buildings in New York City
