= Equiniti =

British company providing shareholder and pension services

Equiniti Group
- Type: Private Limited Company
- Traded as: FORMER lse:EQN
- ISIN: GB00BYWWHR75
- Industry: Financial services
- Founded: 2007; 19 years ago
- Headquarters: Crawley, England, UK
- Key people: Dan Kramer (Chief Executive Officer)
- Website: equiniti.com

Equiniti Group Limited provides stock transfer agent and pension administration services. The company's primary office is in West Sussex, United Kingdom.

== History ==
The business was originally Lloyds TSB Registrars, a subsidiary of Lloyds Bank. In October 2007, Advent International, a private equity firm, acquired the business for £550 million.

Equiniti India opened in Chennai in 2014. An additional office opened in Bengaluru in 2019.

The company became a public company via an initial public offering in October 2015.

In July 2017, the company acquired the share registration business of Wells Fargo.

In June 2020, the company rebranded as "EQ" for marketing purposes.

In December 2021, Siris Capital acquired the company for £661 million. The company was merged with American Stock Transfer & Trust Company.

In July 2025, members of the Public and Commercial Services Union, who were working for MyCSP, which administered pensions of civil servants and is owned 75% by Equiniti, began a strike action which lasted for almost five months, running until the end of the company's contract. The strike was in protest of the outsourcing of employment to Capita.

In May 2026, the cryptocurrency exchange Bullish agreed to acquire Equiniti from Siris Capital for $4.2 billion, including $1.85 billion of assumed debt and $2.35 billion in Bullish stock.
