= Guy de Lasteyrie =

French noble (1879-1944)

The Marquis de Lasteyrie
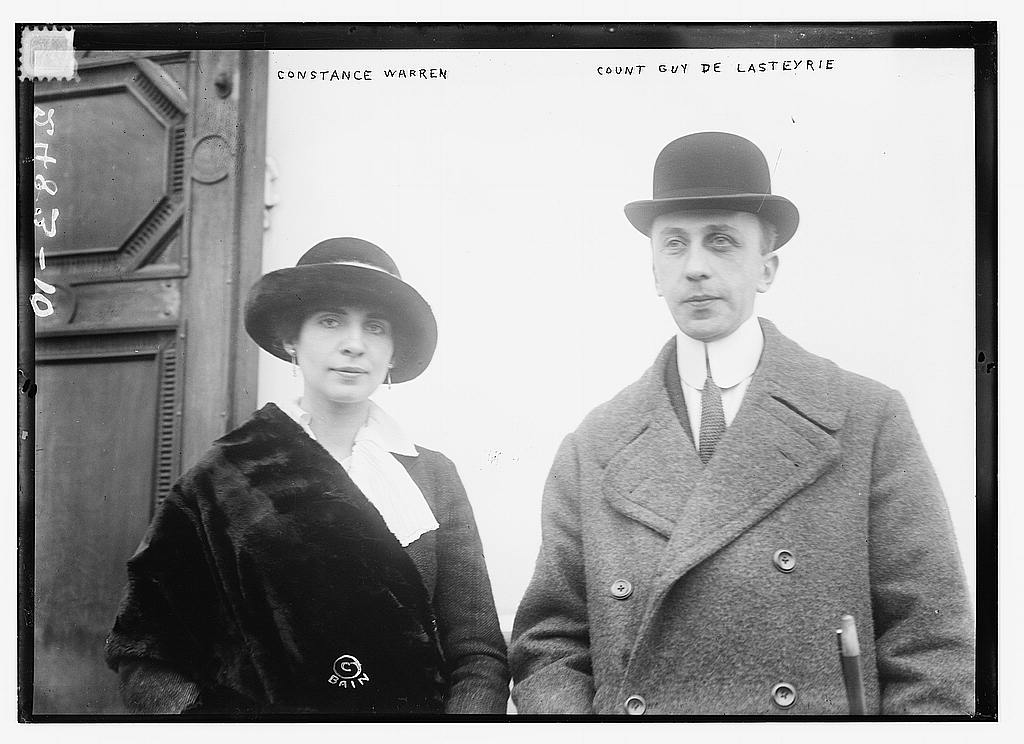
- Photograph of Constance and the Count de Lasteyrie, 1912
- Born: Guy Louis Jules de Lasteyrie du Saillant; 3 October 1879
- Died: 14 August 1944 (aged 64)
- Spouse: Constance Whitney Warren (m. 1912, divorced)

Guy Louis Jules de Lasteyrie du Saillant, 5th Marquis de Lasteyrie du Saillant (3 October 1879 – 14 August 1944), of Ponthieu, was a member of the Lasteyrie du Saillant noble family of France.

== Early life ==
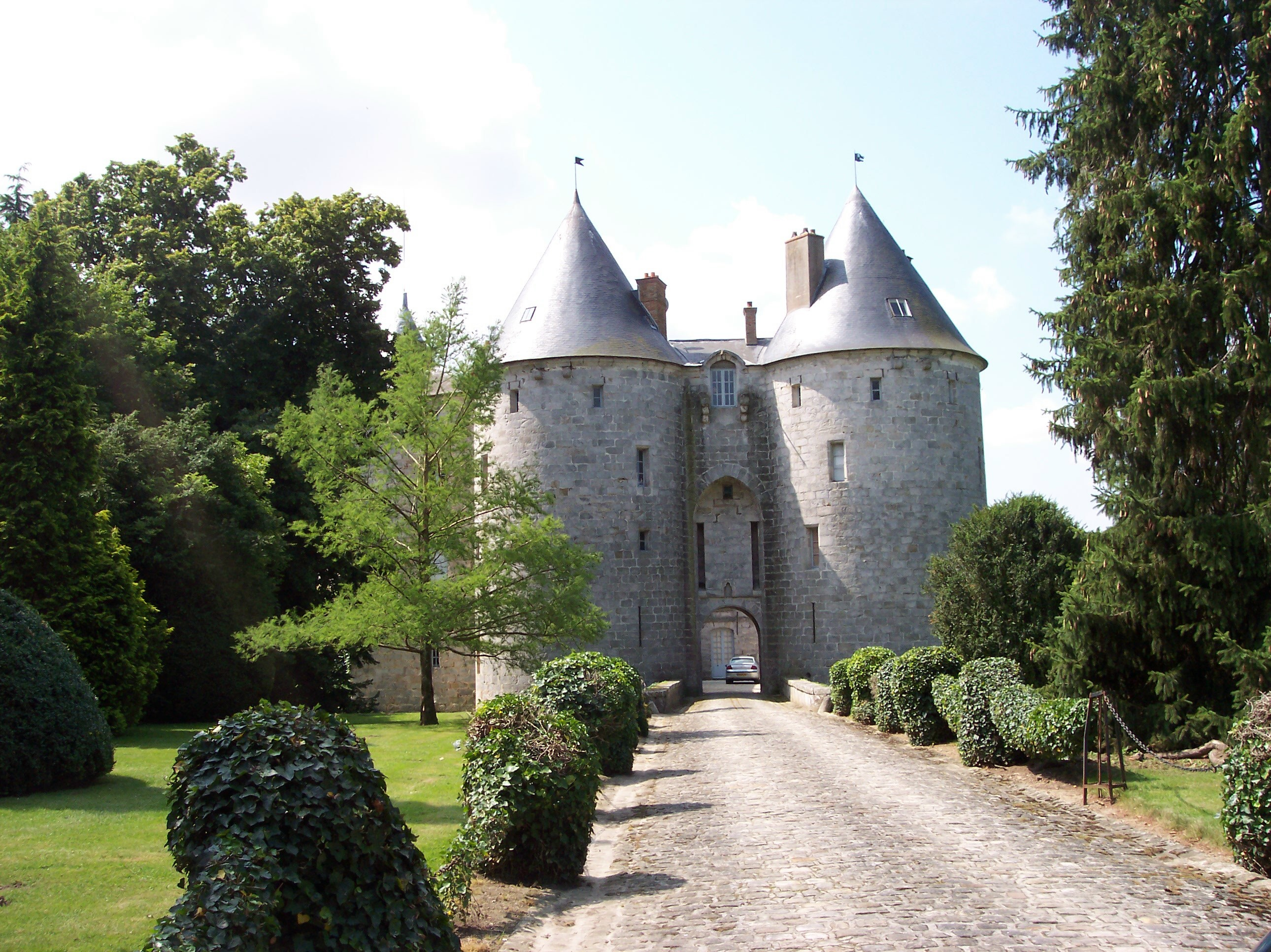
Château de la Grange-Bléneau.

Guy Louis Jules de Lasteyrie du Saillant was born on 3 October 1879. From birth until his father died in 1923, he was referred to as "Count" Guy de Lasteyrie, as it was customary to address the eldest son of a marquis as "Count." He was the eldest son of Louis Pierre Gilbert de Lasteyrie du Saillant, 4th Marquis de Lasteyrie du Saillant (1849–1923) and the English Olivia Elizabeth Goodlake (1853–1916), who were second cousins. His younger brother was Louis de Lasteyrie du Saillant (who married Henriette Chodron de Courcel, a daughter of Baron Alphonse Chodron de Courcel). His family had a home in Paris and in the French countryside, known as the Château de la Grange-Bléneau.

Through his father's family, Guy was a great-great-grandson of American Revolutionary War hero Gilbert du Motier, Marquis de Lafayette, through his youngest daughter, Marie Antoinette Virginie du Motier, who married Louis de Lasteyrie, Marquis de Lasteyrie, and had four children. Their son, and Guy de Lasteyrie's grandfather, was Adrien Jules de Lasteyrie, who married Olivia de Rohan-Chabot (a daughter of the émigré Louis de Rohan, Vicomte de Chabot, and Lady Charlotte Fitzgerald). His paternal great-uncle was Ambassador Philippe de Rohan-Chabot. His maternal grandparents were Thomas Mills Goodlake, the High Sheriff of Berkshire, and Emilia Maria (née Baker) Goodlake (a daughter of Lt. Col. Sir Edward Baker, 1st Baronet and Lady Elizabeth FitzGerald). (Note: His maternal great-grandmother, Lady Elizabeth Mary FitzGerald (1780–1857), was an older sister of a paternal great-grandmother's Lady Isabella Charlotte Fitzgerald (1784–1868), both being daughters of William FitzGerald, 2nd Duke of Leinster (1749–1804).). His maternal uncle was Crimean War soldier Gerald Goodlake VC.

== Career ==
During World War I, his wife volunteered with the Red Cross of France by driving an ambulance while he fought with his cavalry regiment at the Front.

In 1923, he officially became the Marquis de Lasteyrie du Saillant upon his father's death. His third cousin was Charles de Lasteyrie.

== Personal life ==
On December 19, 1912, Guy was married to sculptor Constance Whitney Warren at St. Patrick's Cathedral in New York City. Constance, who shared his love of horses, was from a large and prominent American family. She was the only daughter of George Henry Warren II, a granddaughter of George Henry Warren, cousin of Robert Walton Goelet and Edith, Lady Queensborough, and niece of Whitney Warren and Lloyd Warren, prominent architects. After their marriage, they lived in an apartment in Paris and at the Château de la Grange, located outside Paris. Guy and Constance were divorced in either 1920 or 1922.

In 1934, Guy and his brother, Louis de Lasteyrie, sold the Château de la Grange-Bléneau to their cousin, René de Chambrun, with a life tenancy.

Guy died on 14 August 1944.
