= Edith Starr Miller =

New York socialite, author, and conspiracy theorist

The Right Honourable The Lady Queenborough

Personal details
- Born: Edith Starr Miller; July 16, 1887 Newport, Rhode Island, U.S.
- Died: January 16, 1933 (aged 45) Paris, France
- Spouse: Almeric Paget, 1st Baron Queenborough (m. 1921; div. 1932)
- Relations: Whitney Warren (uncle); Lloyd Warren (uncle); Robert Walton Goelet (cousin); Constance W. Warren (cousin)
- Children: 3
- Parent(s): William Starr Miller II; Edith Caroline Warren Miller

Edith, Lady Queenborough (formerly Edith Starr Miller; July 16, 1887 – January 16, 1933) was an American-born British socialite, author, and conspiracy theorist.

== Early life ==
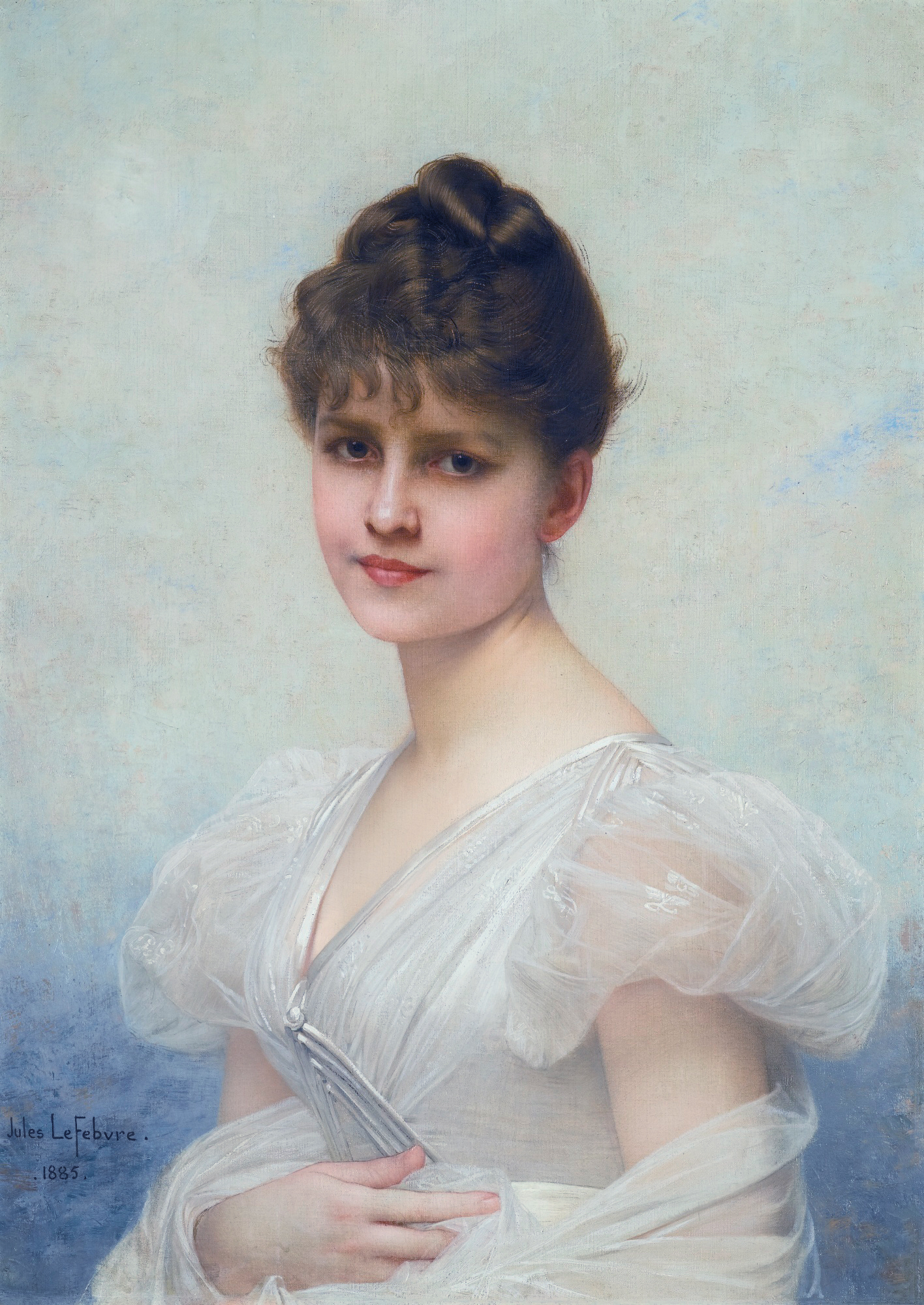
Edith's mother, the former Edith Caroline Warren, by Jules Joseph Lefebvre, 1885

Edith was born in Newport, Rhode Island, on July 16, 1887. She was the only child of William Starr Miller II (1856–1935) and Edith Caroline (née Warren) Miller. (1866–1944). Her father, a Harvard and Columbia Law School graduate, was a wealthy industrialist and real estate operator in New York City.

His paternal grandparents were Sarah Caroline Tucker (née Chace) Miller and George Norton Miller (brother of her father's namesake, U.S. Representative William S. Miller). Her maternal grandparents were George Henry Warren (one of the founders of the Metropolitan Opera) and Mary Caroline (née Phoenix) Warren (a daughter of U.S. Representative Jonas P. Phoenix and granddaughter of Stephen Whitney, one of the wealthiest merchants in New York City). Among her extended family were uncles Whitney Warren and Lloyd Warren, prominent architects, and cousins Robert Walton Goelet (a financier and real estate developer) and Constance Whitney Warren (a sculptor who married Count Guy de Lasteyrie).

== Occult Theocrasy ==
Edith and her husband were allegedly pro-Fascist, and Edith in particular was friendly with Brigadier-General Robert Byron Drury Blakeney. Blakeney was the second president of the British Fascisti from 1924 to 1926, and was later active in the Imperial Fascist League, The Britons, the British Union of Fascists, and the Nordic League.

Edith and her close friend L. Fry (Paquita de Shishmareff) (1882–1970) spent about 10 years (1922–1931) researching many of the most important secret societies existing at that time in Europe and the Middle East. They detailed their findings in Occult Theocrasy (2 vols.) (Chatou, France: British American Press, 1931-1933), a work whose publication was completed shortly after Edith's death. "Occult Theocrasy" is now widely regarded as a "conspiracy classic." The work summarizes what was known at that time about the organizations and secret societies which collectively form what is now referred to, variously, as the Cabal, the Illuminati, the One World Government, the Secret World Government, or the New World Order. As a whole, Occult Theocrasy was more comprehensive and up-to-date in its subject-matter than any other similar work available in the English language at that time. The work contains overt antisemitic elements and attributes much of world history to a conspiracy of Jews. It gives credence to the infamous Protocols of the Elders of Zion, and has two chapters that express praise for the mission of the Ku Klux Klan. Most of the source information for Occult Theocrasy is listed in the book's bibliography. The work also features a brief occult glossary, and a detailed index.

== Personal life ==
Photograph of her husband, Almeric Paget, 1st Baron Queenborough, in 1921.

On July 19, 1921, Edith became the second wife of Almeric Hugh Paget, 1st Baron Queenborough, a British industrialist and former Conservative MP. Lord Queenborough, a son of Lord Alfred Paget (himself the fifth son of Henry Paget, 1st Marquess of Anglesey), was widowed from first wife, the former Pauline Payne Whitney (a daughter of fellow Americans William C. Whitney and Flora Payne Whitney), who died in 1916. After Pauline's death, Paget resigned from the House of Commons and was elevated to the peerage as Baron Queenborough. Edith's marriage to Lord Queenborough took place at the New York townhouse of Edith's parents, which was located at 1048 Fifth Avenue on the corner of 86th Street in Manhattan. Lord Queenborough was in New York visiting his late wife's brothers, Harry Payne Whitney and Payne Whitney and attending the Harding inauguration. After their marriage, the Pagets lived at Camfield Place, near Hatfield, Hertfordshire, England. The interiors of the house were designed by Edith herself. Together, the Pagets had three daughters:

- Hon. Audrey Elizabeth Paget (1922–1990), who became an aviator who married four times: Christian Martell DFC, Anthony Ronan Nelson (son of Thomas Arthur Nelson), Claud Peter Harcourt Lucy (son of Claud Arthur Lucy), and Sir Thomas Musker.
- Hon. Enid Louise Paget (b. 1923), who married Capt. Count Roland de la Poype, in 1947. They later divorced.
- Hon. Cicilie Carol Paget (1928–2013), who married Capt. Robert Victor John Evans, son of Brigadier John Meredyth Jones Evans and actress Camille Clifford, in 1949.

The Pagets later separated, and Edith sued for legal separation in New York City on January 8, 1932, citing cruelty and abandonment of her and their three children.

Edith died a year later in a hospital in Paris after a surgery on January 16, 1933, at the age of forty-five. Lord Queenborough died in 1949, at which point the barony became extinct.

=== Descendants ===
Through her daughter Audrey, she was posthumously a grandmother of Thomas Lorne Nelson (b. 1947), Audrey Caroline Nelson (b. 1949), and Elizabeth Christian Nelson (b. 1950). In 1979, Thomas married Georgina Astor, daughter of Michael Astor (the fourth son of Waldorf Astor, 2nd Viscount Astor and Nancy Astor), after her divorce from Hon. Anthony Ramsay, a son of the 16th Earl of Dalhousie. In 1978, garden designer Audrey married Max Wyndham, 7th Baron Leconfield, 2nd Baron Egremont and they reside at Petworth House in Sussex.

Through her daughter Enid, she was also posthumously a grandmother of Charles Henri de la Poype (b. 1949) and Isabelle Victoria de la Poype (b. 1951).

Through her daughter Cicilie, she was also posthumously a grandmother of Eton graduate John Almeric Evans (b. 1950), Camilla Carol Evans (1952–1963), Michael Hugh Evans (b. 1956), and Patricia Antoinetta Evans (b. 1959).

== Publications ==
- Common Sense in the Kitchen: Normal Rations in Normal Times. New York: Brentano's (1918).
- Occult Theocracy (2 vols.) (1933). Published posthumously.
