= George Henry Warren =

American lawyer (1823–1892)

- Born: November 18, 1823; Troy, New York
- Died: April 8, 1892 (aged 68); Manhattan
- Education: Union College
- Occupation: Lawyer
- Known for: Co-founder of New York Metropolitan Opera
- Spouse: Mary Caroline Phoenix (1851–1892)
- Children: 9, including George, Whitney, Lloyd
- Parent(s): Nathan Warren; Mary Bouton Warren
- Relatives: Joseph M. Warren (cousin); Constance Whitney Warren (granddaughter); Robert Walton Goelet (grandson); Edith, Lady Queensborough (granddaughter)

George Henry Warren (November 18, 1823 – April 8, 1892) was an American lawyer who co-founded the New York Metropolitan Opera.

== Early life ==
Warren was born on November 18, 1823, in Troy, New York. He was a son of Nathan Warren and Mary (née Bouton) Warren. Among his siblings was Harriet Louise Warren (wife of Gen. Edmund Shriver), musical composer Nathan Bouton Warren, and Stephen Eliakim Warren, a graduate of Trinity College.

His paternal grandparents were Eliakim Warren and Phebe (née Bouton) Warren and his maternal grandparents were Nathan Bouton and Abigail (née Burlock) Bouton. His paternal grandfather and maternal grandmother were siblings, both descendants of John Bouton, a Huguenot who came to Boston in 1635. Through his paternal uncle, Stephan Warren, he was a first cousin of Joseph M. Warren, a U.S. Representative from New York.

He graduated from Union College in Schenectady, New York, in 1843.

== Career ==
After graduation, Warren relocated to New York City and was engaged in the practice of law and in financial operations there. He served as director of many large and important companies, including the Union Trust Company.

He took an active interest in the direction of the affairs of the Metropolitan Opera House.

== Personal life ==
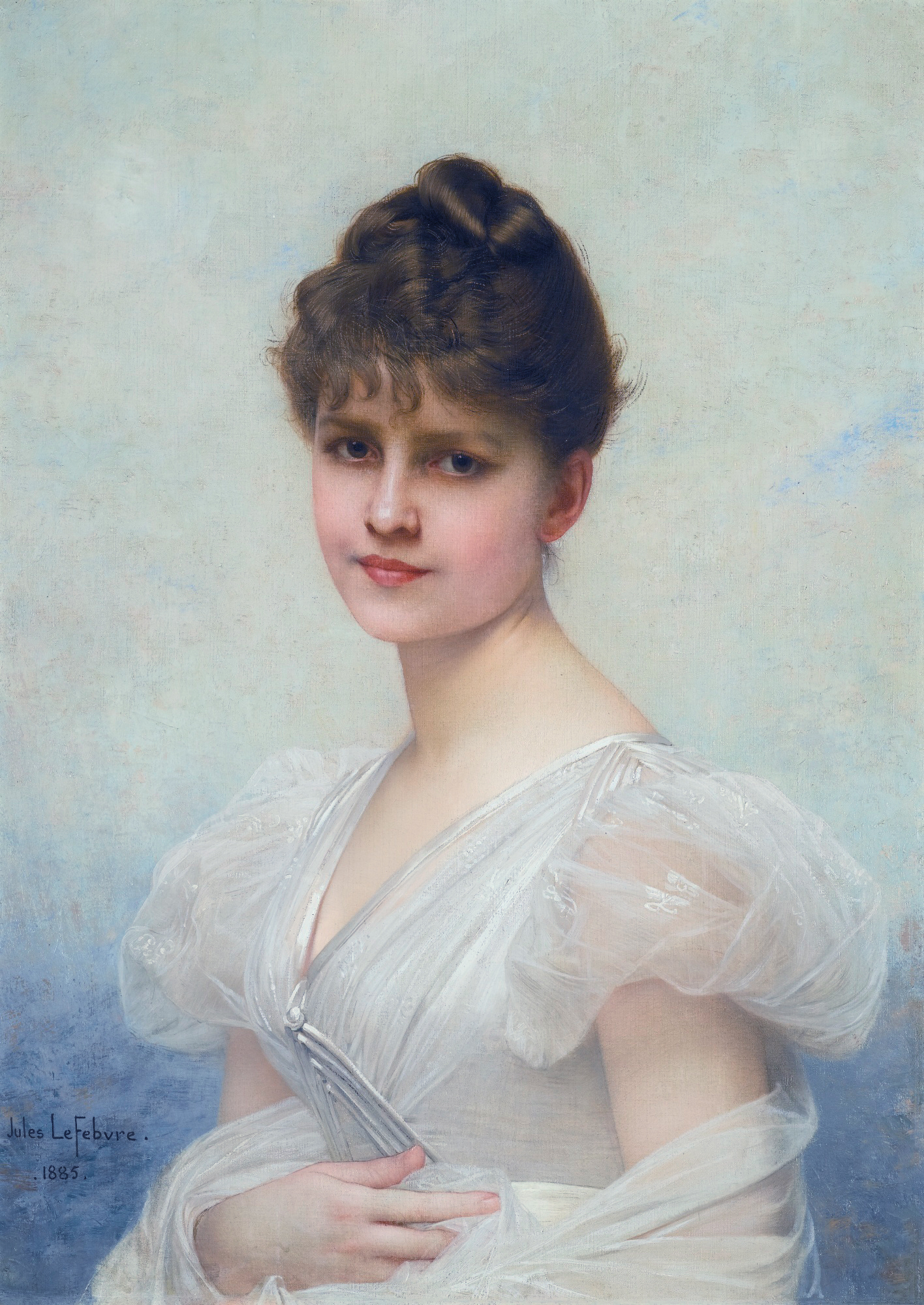
Portrait of Warren's youngest daughter, Edith, by Jules Joseph Lefebvre, 1885

On April 29, 1851, Warren was married to Mary Caroline Phoenix (1832–1901). Mary was a daughter of U.S. Representative Jonas P. Phoenix and Mary (née Whitney) Phoenix Mary (a daughter of Stephen Whitney, one of the wealthiest merchants in New York City). Together, they were the parents of nine children, including:

- Mary Ida Warren (1852–1899), who married Robert Percy Alden (1848–1909) in 1878 in Paris.
- Harriette Warren (1854–1912), who married wealthy businessman and yachtsman Robert Goelet in 1879.
- George Henry Warren II (1855–1943), a stockbroker who married Georgia "Daisy" Williams (1863–1937).
- Emeline Whitney Dore Warren (b. 1857), who died unmarried.
- Edmund Warren (b. 1861), who died young.
- Whitney Phoenix Warren (1864–1943), a twin who became a prominent Gilded Age architect with Warren and Wetmore. He married Charlotte Tooker, a daughter of Gabriel Mead Tooker.
- Anna Phoenix Warren (1864–1865), a twin who died young.
- Edith Caroline Warren (1866–1944), who married industrialist and real estate operator William Starr Miller II. They lived at 1048 Fifth Avenue (on the corner of 86th Street) designed by Carrère and Hastings (Warren and Wetmore did their Newport cottage).
- Lloyd Eliot Warren (1868–1922), who was also an architect.

Warren died on April 8, 1892, at 520 Fifth Avenue, his home in Manhattan. He was buried in the Warren Chapel at Oakwood Cemetery in Troy.

=== Descendants ===
Through his eldest daughter Mary Ida, he was a grandfather of two: John Percy Coleman Alden and George Henry Warren Alden.

Through his son George, he was a grandfather of Constance Whitney Warren, a sculptor who married Count Guy de Lasteyrie, son of the Marquis de Lasteyrie and a descendant of Gilbert du Motier, marquis de Lafayette.

Through his daughter Harriette, he was the grandfather of Robert Walton Goelet (1880–1941), a financier and real estate developer.

Through his daughter Edith, he was the grandfather of the author Edith Starr Miller (1887–1933), who married Almeric Paget, 1st Baron Queenborough in 1921 (after the death of his first wife, Pauline Payne Whitney). Edith co-wrote Occult Theocrasy,
