= Constance Whitney Warren =

American sculptor (1888–1948)

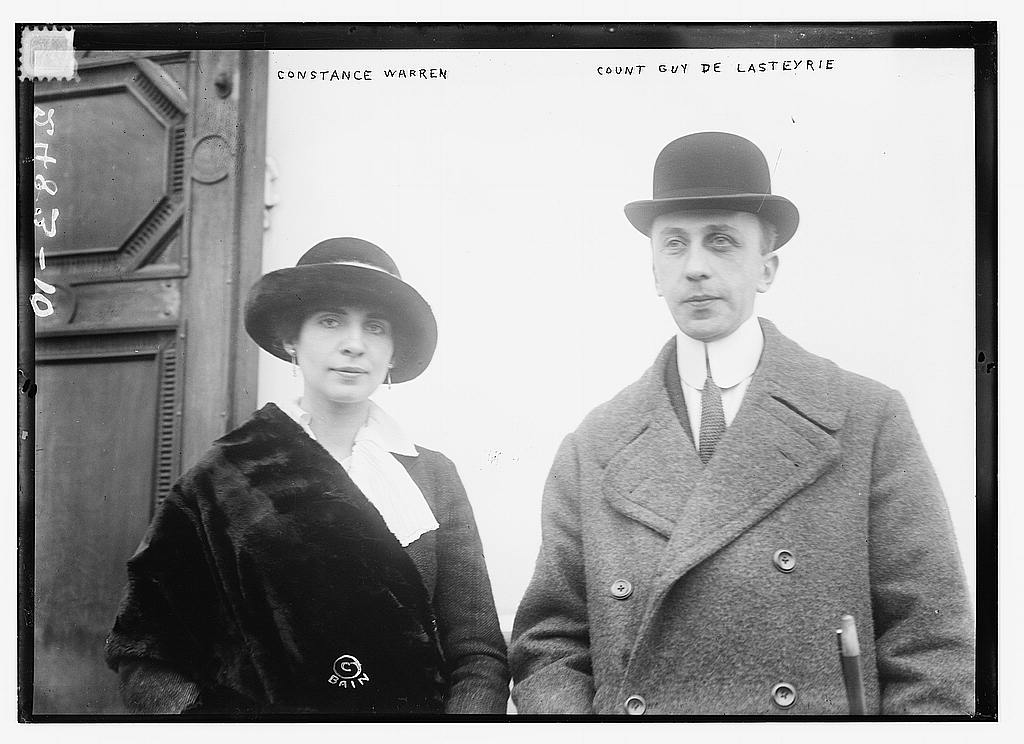
- Photograph of Constance and the Count de Lasteyrie, 1912
- Born: January 17, 1888; New York City, U.S.
- Died: October 11, 1948 (aged 60); Beacon, New York, U.S.
- Resting place: Evergreen Cemetery in Stonington, Connecticut
- Occupation: Sculptor
- Spouse: Count Guy de Lasteyrie (m. 1912, divorced)
- Parent(s): George Henry Warren II; Georgia Williams Warren
- Relatives: George Henry Warren (grandfather)

Constance Whitney Warren (January 17, 1888 – October 11, 1948) was a 20th-century American sculptor.

== Early life ==
Warren was born in New York City on January 17, 1888, to George Henry Warren II (1855–1943) and Georgia "Daisy" Williams (1863–1937). Her parents had a townhouse in New York and a large cottage in Newport, Rhode Island.

Warren's maternal grandparents were George Henry Warren (one of the founders of the Metropolitan Opera) and Mary Caroline (née Phoenix) Warren (a daughter of U.S. Representative Jonas P. Phoenix and granddaughter of Stephen Whitney, one of the wealthiest merchants in New York City). Among her extended family were uncles Whitney Warren and Lloyd Warren, prominent architects, and cousins Robert Walton Goelet (a financier and real estate developer) and Edith Starr Miller (an author who married Almeric Paget, 1st Baron Queenborough).

== Career ==
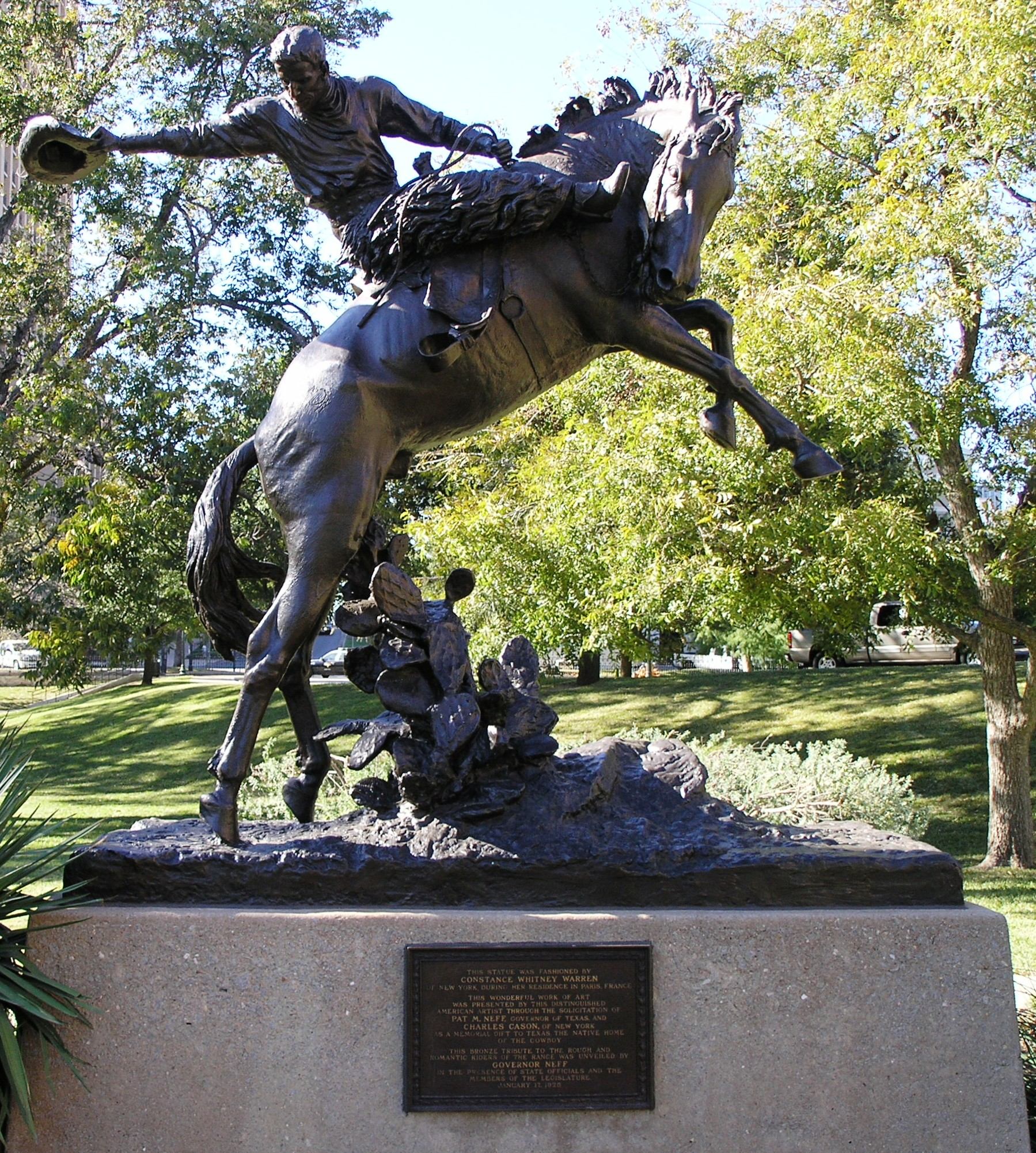
Cowboy Memorial, Texas State Capitol, Austin, Texas, 1921–25.

During World War I, Warren chauffeured English staff officers.

After the war, Warren became a prominent sculptor and, a few years later, she exhibited at the Paris Salon and her reputation spread to the United States. Today she is known for various sculptures, including the 1921–25 Texas Cowboy Monument at the Texas State Capitol in Austin, Texas, the 1926–29 Tribute to Range Riders at the Oklahoma State Capitol in Oklahoma City, Oklahoma, the 1924 Lariat Cowboy in Phoenix, Arizona. A smaller scale representation of The Cowboy, which won Warren an Honorable Mention at the aforementioned Paris Salon, belongs to the collection of the Gilcrease Museum in Tulsa, Oklahoma.

== Personal life ==
On December 19, 1912, Warren married Count Guy de Lasteyrie at St. Patrick's Cathedral, New York. He was the eldest son of the Marquis de Lasteyrie and the former Olivia Elizabeth Goodlake. Count Guy was a direct descendant, a great-great grandson, of the French aristocrat and American Revolutionary War hero Gilbert du Motier, marquis de Lafayette. They divorced in the early 1920s before his father's death in 1923, when he became the marquis de Lasteyrie du Saillant.

After her marriage in 1912, Warren lived in Paris and at a chateau in the French countryside.

== Death and burial ==
Sadly, in November 1930, "she was committed to an institution for the insane, remaining there until her death eighteen years later on October 11, 1948, in Beacon, New York." She was buried at Evergreen Cemetery in Stonington, Connecticut.
