= William Starr Miller II =

American businessman (1856–1935)

- Born: October 26, 1856; New York City, New York, U.S.
- Died: September 14, 1935 (aged 78); New York City, New York, U.S.
- Resting place: Green-Wood Cemetery
- Education: Harvard University; Columbia Law School
- Spouse: Edith Caroline Warren (m. 1886)
- Children: Edith Starr Miller
- Parent(s): George Norton Miller; Sarah Caroline Tucker Chace
- Relatives: William S. Miller (uncle); Baron Queenborough (son-in-law)

William Starr Miller II (October 26, 1856 – September 14, 1935) was a prominent New York industrialist and real estate operator.

== Early life ==
Miller was born in New York City on October 26, 1856. He was a son of George Norton Miller I (1805–1891) and Sarah Caroline Tucker (née Chace) (1832–1872), who were married on October 9, 1855 in Boston, Massachusetts. William was named in honor of his father's brother, William Starr Miller I (1793–1854), who served as a Representative from New York in the 29th United States Congress and died about before William II was born. His siblings were George Norton Miller Jr. (1857–1935) and Horatio Ray Miller (1861–1905).

William Starr Miller II attended Harvard University from 1874 to 1878, graduating with an A.B. degree in 1878. He then attended Columbia Law School, where he graduated in 1880 with an LL.B. degree.

== Career ==
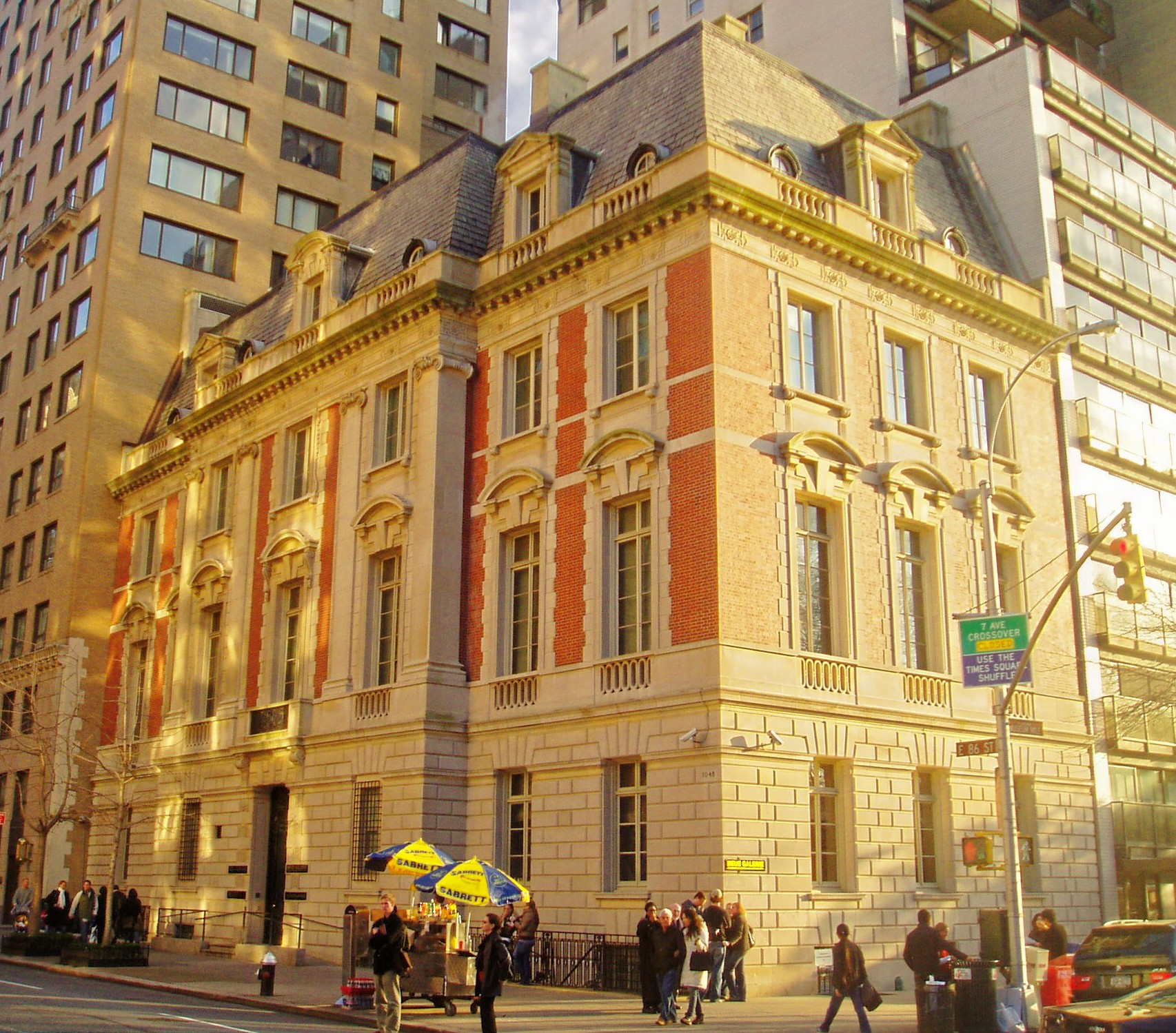
William Starr Miller House

In 1880, he was admitted to the New York City Bar. His original business address was 39 Fifth Avenue, Manhattan, New York.

Miller was a member of the Knickerbocker Club and the Union Club of New York.

=== Residence ===
Miller commissioned his brother-in-law, Whitney Warren, a partner in Warren and Wetmore, to design them a French Norman-style "cottage" in Newport, Rhode Island named High Tide, with interiors by noted designer Ogden Codman. They turned to architects Carrère and Hastings, however, for their New York City residence at 1048 Fifth Avenue, in Manhattan. This house became the Neue Galerie in 2001.

== Personal life ==
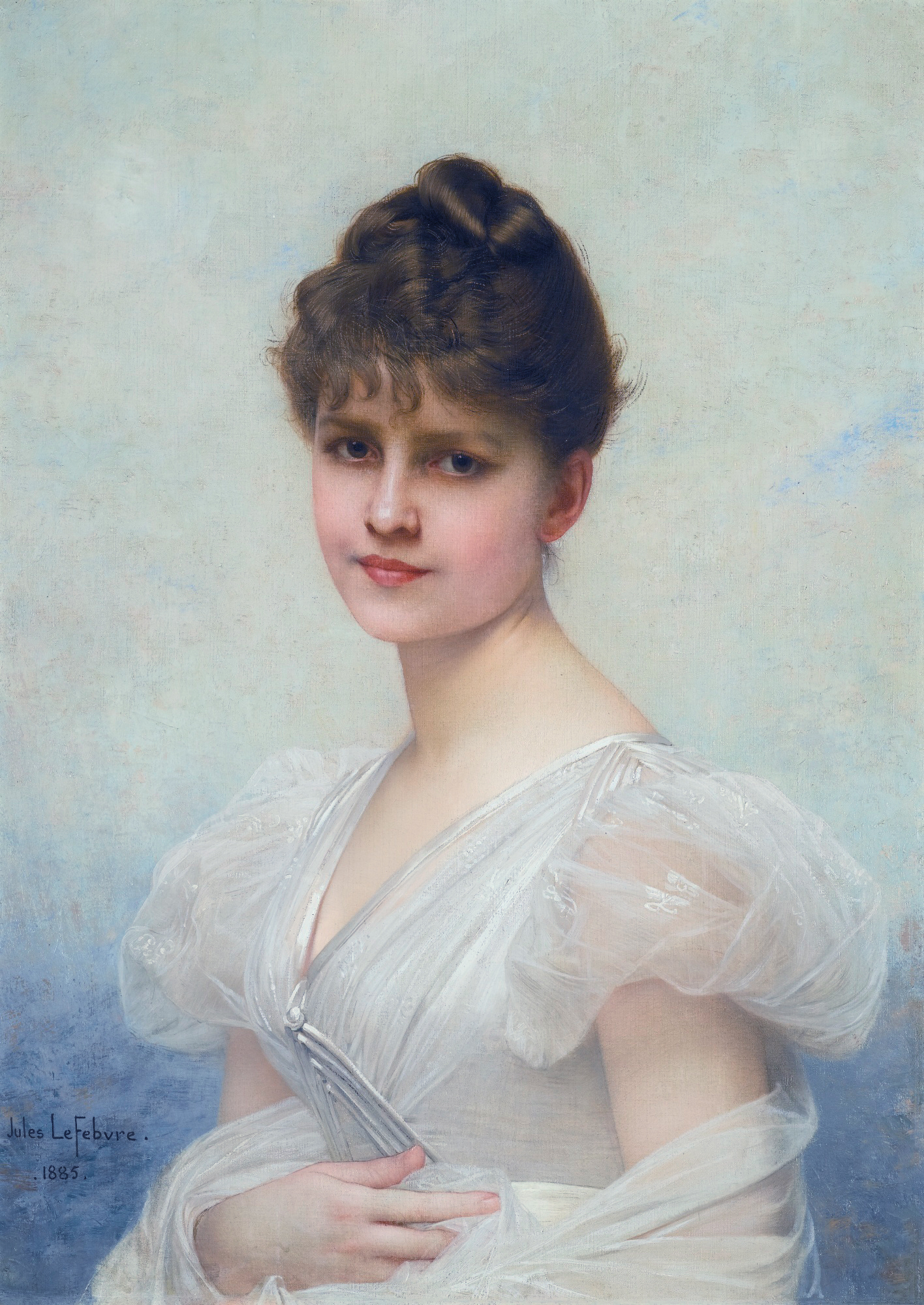
Miller's wife, Edith Caroline Warren, by Jules Joseph Lefebvre, 1885

On April 28, 1886, Miller married Edith Caroline Warren (1866–1944). She was a daughter of George Henry Warren (1823–1892) and Mary Caroline Phoenix (1832–1901). Her father was one of the founders of the New York Metropolitan Opera and her brother was the architect Whitney Warren. Together, they were the parents of:

- Edith Starr Miller (1887-1933), an author who married Almeric Paget, 1st Baron Queenborough (1861–1949) in 1921 after the death of his first wife, fellow American Pauline Payne Whitney. Edith co-wrote Occult Theocrasy (a famous conspiracy classic dealing with the Bavarian Order of the Illuminati and other secret societies) with Paquita de Shishmareff (pen-name: L. Fry) (1882-1970).

Miller died on September 14, 1935, at his Fifth Avenue mansion. Miller, his wife, his parents, and several of his other close relatives are all buried in Green-Wood Cemetery in Brooklyn.

=== Descendants ===
Through his daughter Edith, he was the grandfather of Audrey Elizabeth Paget (1922–1990), an aviator, Enid Louise Paget (b. 1923), and Cicilie Carol Paget (1928–2013).
