= Tribute to Range Riders =

Sculpture in Oklahoma City, Oklahoma, U.S.

- Artist: Constance Whitney Warren
- Location: Oklahoma City, Oklahoma, U.S.
- 35.491414°N 97.503554°W

Tribute to Range Riders is a bronze sculpture by Constance Whitney Warren, installed outside the Oklahoma State Capitol in Oklahoma City, in the U.S. state of Oklahoma. The statue depicts a cowboy riding a bucking horse.
