= Robert Walton Goelet =

American financier and real estate developer

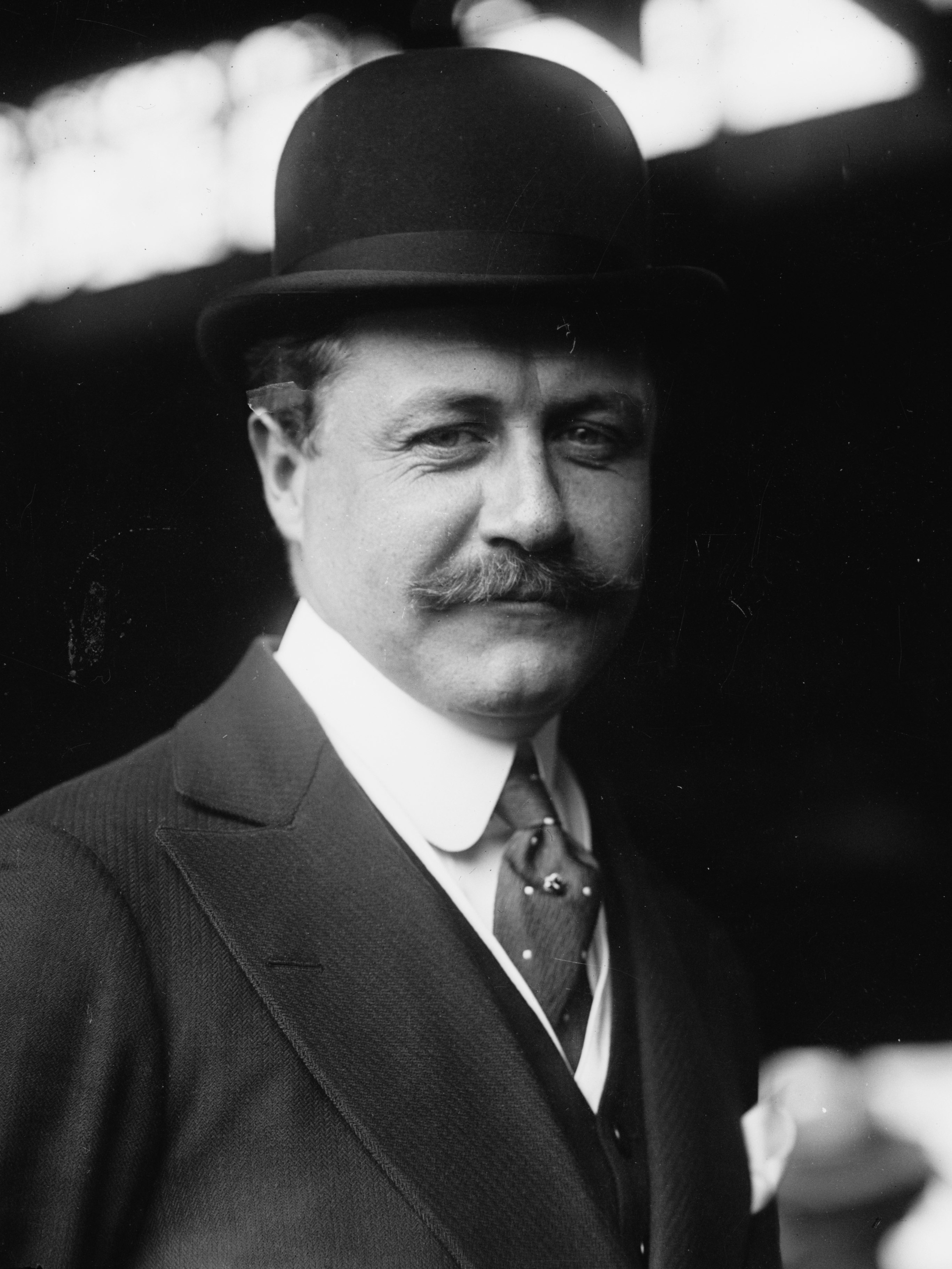
- Born: March 19, 1880; New York City, New York, U.S.
- Died: May 2, 1941 (aged 61); New York City, New York, U.S.
- Education: Harvard University
- Occupations: Financier, real estate developer
- Spouse: Anne Marie Guestier (m. 1921)
- Children: Beatrice Goelet; Robert Guestier Goelet; Francis Goelet; John Goelet
- Parent(s): Robert Goelet; Henrietta Louise Warren
- Relatives: See Goelet family

Robert Walton Goelet (March 19, 1880 – May 2, 1941) was an American financier and real estate developer in New York City. He was one of the largest property owners in the city by the time of his death.

== Early life ==
Robert Walton Goelet, nicknamed Bertie to avoid confusion with his cousin Robert Wilson Goelet (whom he strongly resembled), was born on March 19, 1880, in New York. He was the only son born to Henrietta Louise (née Warren) Goelet and Robert Goelet (1841–1899), a prominent landlord in New York. His only sister, Beatrice Goelet, who died of pneumonia at age 17 in 1902, was painted as a child by John Singer Sargent.

His paternal grandparents were Sarah (née Ogden) Goelet and Robert Goelet, one of the founders of the Chemical Bank and Trust Company (later known as JPMorgan Chase). His uncle, Ogden Goelet, was the builder of Ochre Court and his two first cousins were Robert Wilson Goelet, the original owner of Glenmere mansion, and Mary Goelet, the wife of Henry Innes-Ker, 8th Duke of Roxburghe. His maternal grandparents were George Henry Warren, a prominent lawyer, and Mary (née Phoenix) Warren (herself the daughter of U.S. Representative Jonas P. Phoenix and granddaughter of Stephen Whitney). His maternal uncles were stockbroker George Henry Warren II and prominent architects Whitney Warren and Lloyd Warren.

Goelet, and his cousin Robert Wilson Goelet, both graduated from Harvard University with an A.B. degree in 1902 and an M.A. degree in 1903.

== Career ==
Upon the death of his mother in 1915, he inherited a fortune estimated to be $40 million (equivalent to $920 million in 2025), which included 591 Fifth Avenue (a brownstone built in 1880 by Edward H. Kendall at the southeast corner of 48th Street) and her estate at Ochre Point in Newport, Rhode Island, designed by Stanford White and built between 1882 and 1884 and known as "Southside". He was a sportsman and the leader of the city's old-money social set. He was a member of the Jekyll Island Club on Jekyll Island, Georgia.

Goelet served as a director of the Metropolitan Opera and Real Estate Company for many years. He was also a member of the advisory board and director of the Chemical National Bank and Trust Company, a director of the Guaranty Trust Company of New York, chairman of the board of directors of the Ritz-Carlton Hotel Corporation and a director of the Union Pacific Railroad Corporation.

=== Real estate holdings ===
In 1908, he purchased the 10,000 acres (4,000 ha) Sandricourt estate, the former residence of the Marquis de Beauvoir, on the outskirts of Paris. The estate, where he spent much of his time, which he purchased for $300,000, had 139 buildings, grain fields and herds of cattle. He also owned a fishing lodge on the Restigouche River, which separates New Brunswick from Quebec (which he left to his children).

He inherited vast real estate holdings in New York, sometimes known as the Goelet Realty Company, which included the Ritz-Carlton Hotel and the property between 52nd and 53rd Streets on Park Avenue which the Racquet and Tennis Club leased. Among his other New York holdings were the southeast corner of 42nd Street and Lexington Avenue, 14 Sutton Place South, 1400 Broadway, 53 Broadway, and the building on the southwest corner of Fifth Avenue and 37th Street (which he bought in 1909). He also owned sixteen four-story townhouses on Park Avenue built by his father in 1871.

After Goelet's death in 1941, his estate leased the land on which the sixteen townhouses were built, which were torn down and replaced by 425 Park Avenue, which, at the time of the construction, it was one of the tallest buildings that utilized the bolted connections. The 32-story building was open in 1957 with National Biscuit Company, Kaye Scholer, Chemical Corn Exchange Bank as major tenants. It too was torn down and replaced by a new tower at 425 Park Avenue designed by architect Norman, Lord Foster, still on land owned by the Goelet family.

== Personal life ==
In 1909, Goelet was reportedly engaged to Mary Harriman, daughter of railroad executive E. H. Harriman. The engagement was later denied in October, and Mary married the sculptor and polo player Charles Cary Rumsey in 1910.

In 1920, he became engaged to Anne Marie Guestier (1899–1988), and later married her in Bordeaux on January 24, 1921. Anne Marie was the daughter of Daniel Guestier, a director of the Orleans Railroad "who at one time was said to have been the wealthiest wine merchant of France and the owner of vast estates." She received the French Legion of Honor for aiding French-American wives during World War II and for providing medical services to inhabitants in the vicinity of Sandricourt, the Goelet family estate outside Paris, after it was liberated in August 1944. Together, Anne Marie and Robert were the parents of four children:

- Beatrice Goelet (1922–2015), who married Hayward Ferry Manice, son of William DeForest Manice, in 1948.
- Robert Guestier Goelet (1924–2019), a former Lt. in the U.S. Navy Reserve who was elected a director of the Chemical Bank in 1952.
- Francis Goelet (1926–1998), a noted philanthropist and patron of the arts who died unmarried.
- John Goelet (1931-2023), who married Henrietta Fanner, daughter of William Rogers Fanner, and later lived in Paris.

After several months of ill health, Goelet died on May 2, 1941, of a heart attack, aged 61, in his brownstone on Fifth Avenue at 48th Street. After a funeral service at St. Thomas Protestant Episcopal Church on Fifth Avenue, he was buried at Woodlawn Cemetery in the Bronx. In his will, he left the Ritz-Carlton Hotel to Harvard University. His widow was given his personal effects and property along with life use of their home on Narragansett Avenue in Newport and their estate in France. His widow lived almost another 47 years until her death in 1988.

=== Legacy ===
In 1958, in Goelet's honor, his widow and four children donated $500,000 toward the construction of the Metropolitan Opera House at Lincoln Center, where the grand staircase bears a plaque with his name.

As of 2012, the Goelet's Newport estate at Narragansett Avenue and the corner of Ochre Point Avenue, remained in the Goelet family.
