= Adolphus H. Tanner =

American politician (1833–1882)

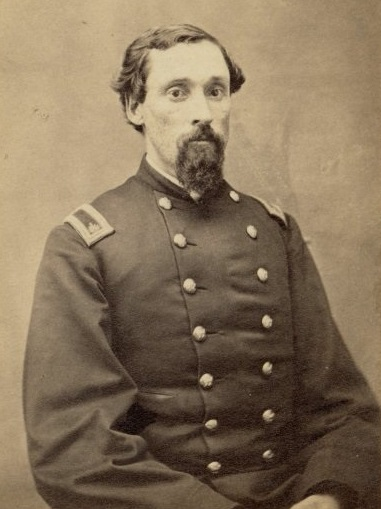
- Tanner as a Union army officer c. 1865

Personal details
- Born: Adolphus Hitchcock Tanner; May 23, 1833 Granville, New York, U.S.
- Died: January 14, 1882 (aged 48) Whitehall, New York, U.S.
- Resting place: Evergreen Cemetery, Salem, New York, U.S.
- Party: Republican
- Occupation: Politician, lawyer

Military service
- Allegiance: United States
- Branch/service: United States Army (Union army)
- Rank: Lieutenant colonel
- Unit: 123rd New York Infantry Regiment
- Battles/wars: American Civil War

Adolphus Hitchcock Tanner (May 23, 1833 – January 14, 1882) was a U.S. representative from New York.

== Biography ==
Born in Granville, Washington County, New York, Tanner completed preparatory studies. He studied law, and was admitted to the bar in 1854 and commenced practice in Whitehall, New York.

During the Civil War, Tanner entered the Union Army in 1862 as a captain in command of Company C, 123rd New York Volunteer Infantry Regiment. He was promoted through the ranks, and was the regiment's lieutenant colonel and second in command at the close of the war.

Tanner was elected as a Republican to the Forty-first Congress (March 4, 1869 – March 3, 1871). He resumed the practice of law in Whitehall, and died there on January 14, 1882. He was interred in Evergreen Cemetery, Salem, New York.

U.S. House of Representatives
Preceded by John Augustus Griswold	Member of the U.S. House of Representatives from New York's 15th congressional district 1869–1871	Succeeded by Joseph M. Warren
