= Henry Nicoll (politician) =

American politician (1812–1879)

Henry Nicoll (October 23, 1812 – November 28, 1879) was an American lawyer and politician who served one term as a United States representative from New York from 1847 to 1849.

== Biography ==
Born in New York City (NYC), he graduated from Columbia College in 1830. He studied law, was admitted to the bar in 1835 and commenced practice in New York City.

=== Political career ===
He was a delegate to the New York constitutional convention in 1847, and was elected as a Democrat to the Thirtieth Congress, holding office from March 4, 1847, to March 3, 1849.

=== Later career and death ===
He resumed the practice of law and in 1879 died in New York City. Interment was in the family burying ground in Mastic.

U.S. House of Representatives
Preceded by William S. Miller	Member of the U.S. House of Representatives from New York's 3rd congressional district 1847–1849	Succeeded by Jonas P. Phoenix
