= George Henry Warren II =

American businessman (1855–1943)

- Born: October 17, 1855; Troy, New York
- Died: June 6, 1943 (aged 87); New York City
- Education: Columbia University; Columbia Law School
- Occupations: Stockbroker, Real estate developer
- Spouse: Georgia Williams (m. 1885; death 1937)
- Children: Constance Whitney Warren; George Henry Warren III
- Parent(s): George Henry Warren; Mary Caroline Phoenix
- Relatives: Jonas P. Phoenix (grandfather); Whitney Warren (brother); Lloyd Warren (brother); Guy de Lasteyrie (son-in-law); Robert Goelet (brother-in-law)

George Henry Warren II (October 17, 1855 – June 3, 1943) was a New York City stockbroker and real estate developer.

== Early life ==
George Henry Warren II was born in Troy, New York, to George Henry Warren and Mary Caroline Phoenix, the sister of Lloyd Phoenix and daughter of U.S. Representative Jonas Phillips Phoenix, who were married on April 29, 1851, in New York City.

G. H. Warren II had nine brothers and sisters, all born from the same father and mother, including: Mary Ida Warren, Harriette Louise Warren, Emeline Whitney Dore Warren, Whitney Phoenix Warren, Edmund Warren, Anna Phoenix Warren, a twin who died young, Whitney Warren, a twin who became a prominent architect, Edith Caroline Warren, and Lloyd Eliot Warren, also an architect.

Warren graduated from Columbia University in 1880 and then Columbia Law School.

== Career ==
After graduating from Law School, Warren decided not to practice law, instead he went into business in the 1890s as a stockbroker on the New York Stock Exchange with Thomas Fortune Ryan, founding the firm of Lee, Ryan & Warren.

Later, Warren became a real estate developer, founding the Metropolitan Opera and Real Estate Company that owned the Metropolitan Opera then located at 1411 Broadway and West 39th Street.

He was a director of the United New Jersey Railroad and Canal Company (which began as the Camden & Amboy Railroad) as well as the Metropolitan Trust Company.

== Personal life ==
On May 14, 1885, Warren was married to Georgia "Daisy" Williams in New York City. They lived in New York City and in Newport, Rhode Island. Together, they were the parents of Constance Whitney Warren, a sculptor who married Count Guy de Lasteyrie, and George Henry Warren III, a member of the New York Stock Exchange who married Katherine Urquhart, founder and president of the Preservation Society of Newport County.

Warren died at his home, 924 Fifth Avenue in New York City, on June 3, 1943.
