= Texas Cowboy Monument =

Sculpture in Austin, Texas, U.S.

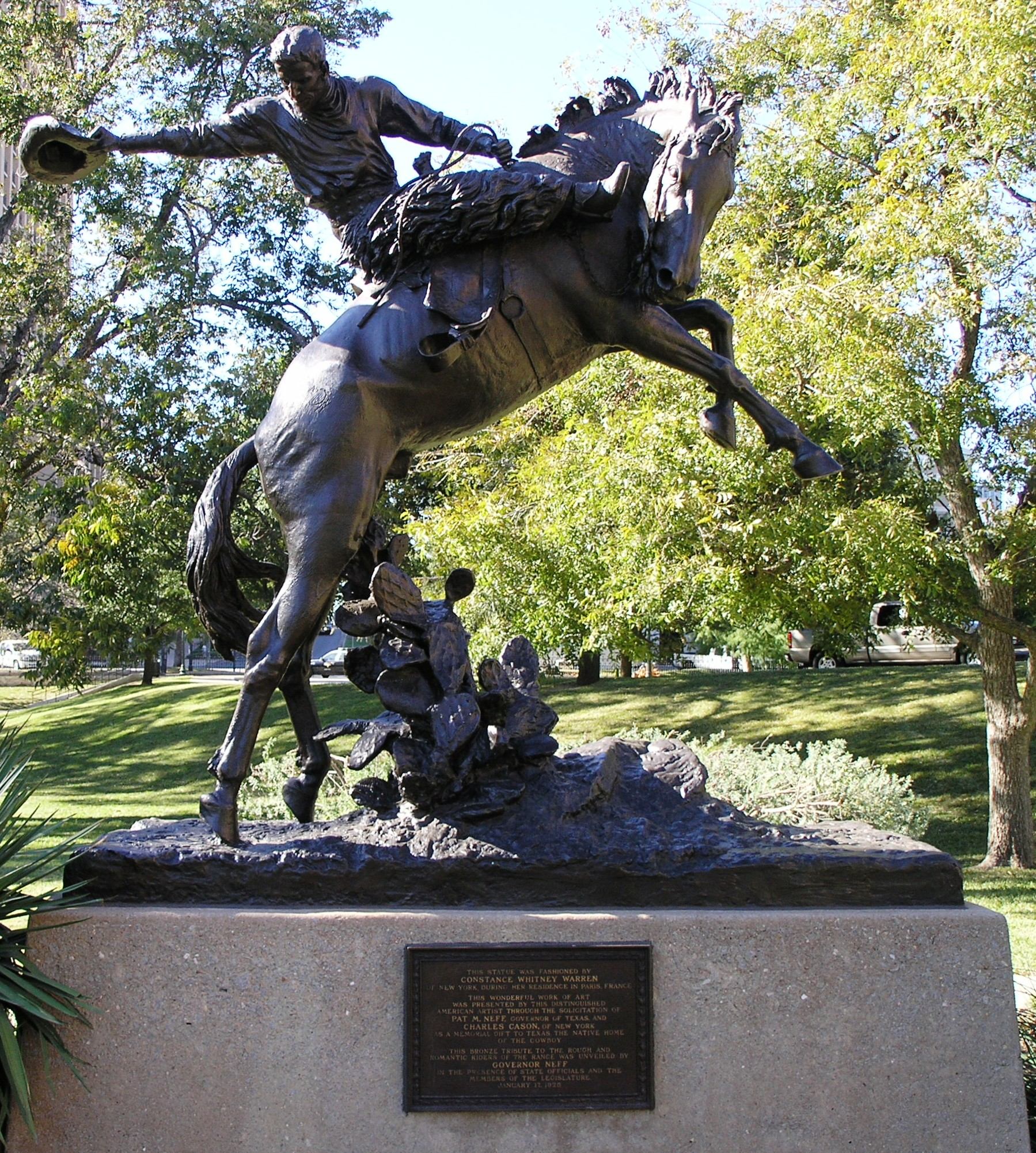
- The monument in 2006
- Artist: Constance Whitney Warren
- Year: 1925
- Medium: Bronze sculpture
- Location: Austin, Texas, United States
- 30.274114°N 97.741449°W

The Texas Cowboy Monument is an outdoor memorial commemorating Texas' cowboys, installed on the Texas State Capitol grounds in Austin, Texas, United States. The monument was sculpted by Constance Whitney Warren and erected in 1925. It features a bronze statue of a cowboy on a rearing horse atop a concrete base.

== See also ==
- 1925 in art
