= Isabella Charlotte de Rohan-Chabot =

Irish aristocrat & diarist (1784–1868)

- Known for: Diarist
- Born: Isabella Charlotte FitzGerald; 16 July 1784; Leinster House, Dublin, Ireland
- Died: 1868 (aged 83–84); France
- Spouses: Louis William de Rohan-Chabot, vicomte de Chabot
- Issue: Philippe de Rohan-Chabot
- Father: William FitzGerald, 2nd Duke of Leinster
- Mother: Emilia Olivia St. George
- Occupation: Première dame d'honneur to Maria Amalia of Naples and Sicily

Isabella Charlotte de Rohan, vicomte de Chabot (16 July 1784 – 1868) was an Irish aristocrat and diarist.

== Early life ==
Isabella Charlotte de Rohan-Chabot was born Isabella Charlotte FitzGerald on 16 July 1784 in Leinster House, Dublin. She was the fourth daughter of William Robert FitzGerald, 2nd Duke of Leinster, and Emilia Olivia (née St. George). Her uncle was Lord Edward FitzGerald. During her childhood she lived at the various family homes of Leinster House, Carton House, County Kildare, and Frescati House, Blackrock. The family fled to Dublin during the 1798 Rebellion.

== Personal life ==
She moved to Cheltenham, Gloucestershire in 1805, where she met and fell in love with William Henry Lyttleton. Her family did not approve of the match, and thus the couple did not marry. She visited London frequently staying with her sister, Lady Olivia Kinnaird, and becoming known in fashionable society. She married Louis William de Rohan-Chabot, vicomte de Chabot (1780–1875), son of the comte de Jarnac, a French officer living in London in June 1809. His mother was Elizabeth Smyth of Tinna Park, County Wicklow. Chabot travelled with her husband to Portugal in 1811, where they lived with Marquis d'Anjega at Belem. When her husband became ill, the couple returned to England travelling through a violent storm in the Bay of Biscay. During the voyage their infant son, who was also ill, died.

== Court life ==
Chabot returned to Ireland in 1812 to visit, and again in 1813 for the birth of her daughter, Olivia. Following the restoration of the French monarchy in 1814, her husband was appointed aide-de-camp to the duc d'Orléans and Chabot became a lady-in-waiting to the duchess, Maria Amalia of Naples and Sicily. The family lived in Paris, where as part of French society she met the future George IV at a soirée. After Napoleon escaped from Elba in 1815, Chabot left France and returned to Carton House. There, she gave birth to another son, Philippe. Following the defeat of Napoleon at Waterloo, Chabot returned to France taking up her duties as a lady-in-waiting to the duchesse d'Orléans and living at the Château de Villiers and the Palais-Royal.

In 1819, she visited Ireland for a long period, travelling with George IV in 1821 as he returned to England on the royal yacht after the Irish royal visit. Chabot's marriage broke up in 1825, and she became depressed. She remained in service as a Dame du Palais, and when the duc d'Orléans was crowned as King Louis-Philippe of France, she became première dame d'honneur to Queen Marie-Amélie. Chabot died in 1868.

== Legacy ==
A descendant, the comte de Chambrun of Château Lagrange, discovered her diaries in 1984, which covered the period from 1806 to 1825. The diary covered her early life in Ireland, her experience of living through the 1798 Rebellion, and her life in France and England.
