= Emanuel B. Hart =

American politician (1809–1897)

Emanuel Hart
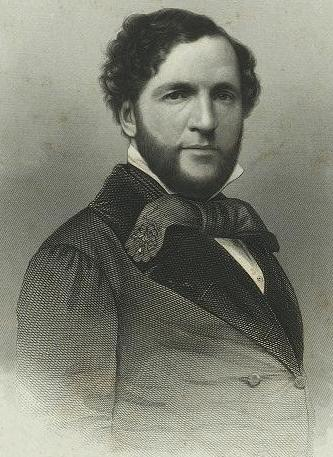

Member of the U.S. House of Representatives from New York's 3rd district
- In office March 4, 1851 – March 3, 1853
- Preceded by: Jonas P. Phoenix
- Succeeded by: Hiram Walbridge

Personal details
- Born: Emanuel Bernard Hart; October 27, 1809 New York City, New York, U.S.
- Died: August 29, 1897 (aged 87) New York City, New York, U.S.
- Resting place: Cypress Hills Cemetery
- Party: Democratic

Emanuel Bernard Hart (October 27, 1809 – August 29, 1897) was an American lawyer and politician who served one term as a U.S. representative from New York from 1851 to 1853.

== Early life and education ==
Born in New York City, Hart attended local public schools. He later studied law and was admitted to the bar in 1868.

== Career ==
He engaged in mercantile pursuits. He served as a colonel in the militia. He served as a member of the New York City Board of Aldermen in 1845.

=== Congress ===
Hart was elected as a Democrat to the Thirty-second Congress (March 4, 1851 – March 3, 1853). Hart was New York's first Jewish congressman. He was the third person of Jewish descent to be elected to the United States Congress, after David Levy Yulee and Lewis Charles Levin.

=== Electoral history ===
New York's 3rd congressional district election, 1848
| Party | Candidate | Votes | % |
|---|---|---|---|
| Whig | J. Phillips Phoenix | 5,601 | 55.01 |
| Democratic | Emanuel B. Hart | 3,788 | 37.20 |
| Free Soil | Reuel Smith | 793 | 7.79 |
| Total votes | | 10,182 | 100.00 |
| Whig gain from Democratic | | | |

New York's 3rd congressional district election, 1850
| Party | Candidate | Votes | % |
|---|---|---|---|
| Democratic | Emanuel B. Hart | 3,679 | 48.42 |
| Independent | John F. Rodman | 2,164 | 28.48 |
| Whig | James Bowen | 1,755 | 23.10 |
| Total votes | | 7,598 | 100.00 |
| Democratic gain from Whig | | | |

== Later career ==
He was later appointed by President James Buchanan to serve as surveyor of the Port of New York from 1857 to 1861. He also served as member of the city board of assessors. He served as president of Mount Sinai Hospital from 1870 to 1876 and New York City's commissioner of immigration from 1870 to 1873. He also worked as treasurer of the Society for the Relief of Poor Hebrews. He was a presidential elector in 1868.

== Death and burial ==
Hart died in New York City on August 29, 1897. He was interred in Cypress Hills Cemetery, Brooklyn, New York.

== See also ==
- List of Jewish members of the United States Congress
