= Philippe de Rohan-Chabot =

French diplomat

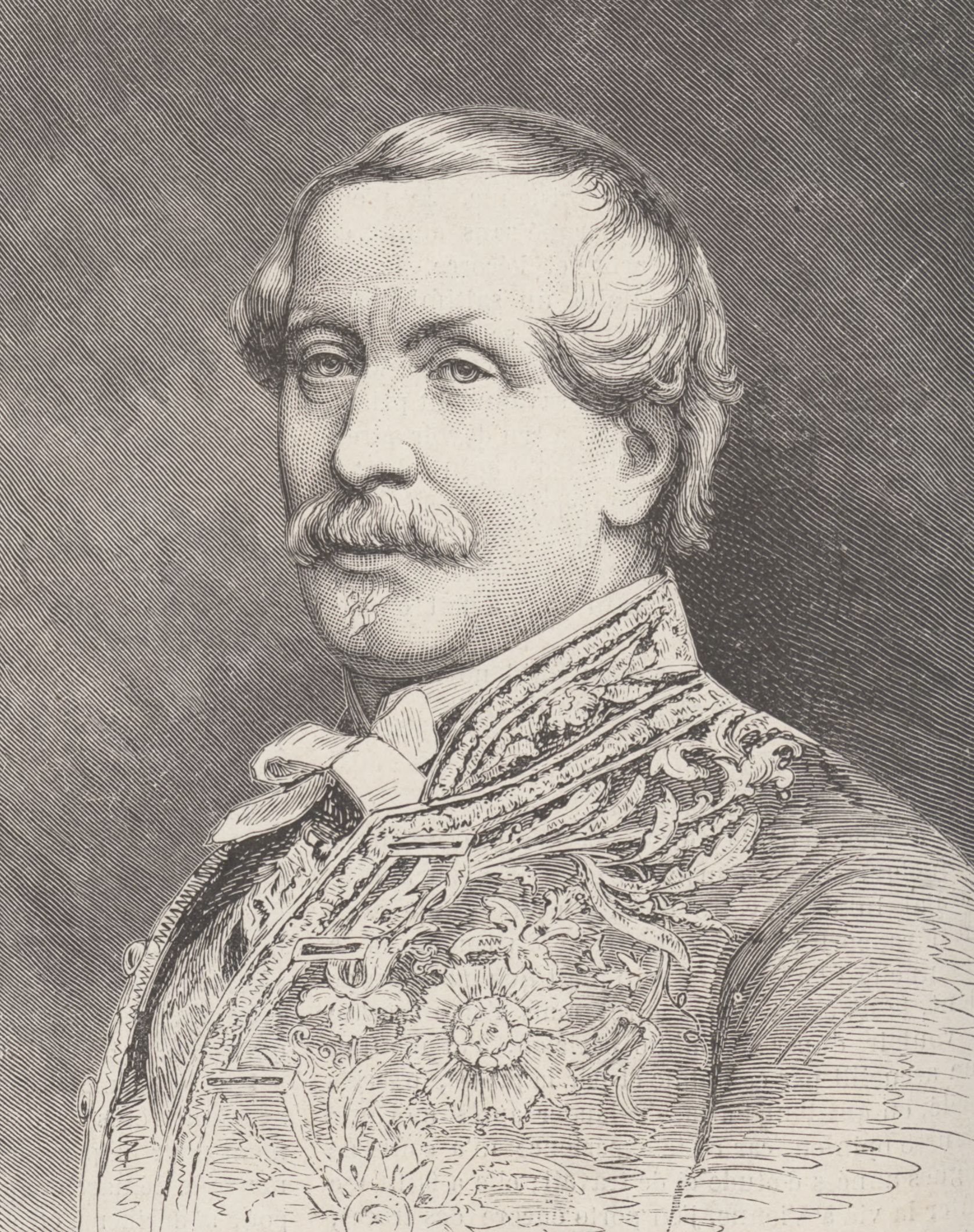
M. le comte de Jarnac

Rohan-Chabot arms

Philippe-Ferdinand-Auguste de Rohan-Chabot (English: /ˈroʊən ʃæˈboʊ/ ROH-ən-sha-BOH, French: [filip də ʁɔɑ̃ ʃabo]; 1815–1875), comte de Jarnac, was a French diplomat of aristocratic descent.

Descended from the ancient Breton family currently represented by Josselin de Rohan, the 14th Duke. He was the only son of General Louis-Guy-Charles-Guillaume de Rohan by his wife Lady Isabelle Fitzgerald, daughter of William FitzGerald, 2nd Duke of Leinster. He succeeded his father in the family titles of vicomte de Chabot and comte de Jarnac. Educated at Harrow School After leading the expedition which returned Emperor Napoleon's remains from Saint Helena, He withdrew from Diplomatic Work 1848-1870 and Lived on his estates in Tipperary, Ireland. He was later appointed, in 1871, French Ambassador to the United Kingdom and was Ambassador again 1874-1875.

He Died in London 22nd May 1875

== Honours ==
- Grand Officier of the Légion d'honneur
- Honorary Knight Grand Cross of the Order of the Bath
- Knight of Malta

== See also ==
- Jarnac Convention
- House of Rohan
- Rohan-Chabot genealogy
