= Jonas P. Phoenix =

American politician (1788–1859)

Member of the U.S. House of Representatives from New York's 3rd district
- In office March 4, 1849 – March 3, 1851
- Preceded by: Henry Nicoll
- Succeeded by: Emanuel B. Hart
- In office March 4, 1843 – March 3, 1845
- Preceded by: Charles G. Ferris, Fernando Wood, James I. Roosevelt, John McKeon
- Succeeded by: William S. Miller

Member of the New York State Assembly
- In office January 1, 1848 – January 31, 1848
- Preceded by: Alexander M. Alling
- Succeeded by: Ephraim H. Hudson
- Constituency: New York County 1st district

Personal details
- Born: Jonas Phillips Phoenix; January 14, 1788 Morristown, New Jersey, U.S.
- Died: May 4, 1859 (aged 71) New York City, New York, U.S.
- Party: Whig
- Spouse: Mary Whitney
- Children: 7
- Parent(s): Daniel Phoenix; Anna Lewis Phillips
- Relatives: Whitney Warren (grandson); George Warren II (grandson); Lloyd Warren (grandson)
- Occupation: Merchant

Jonas Phillips Phoenix (January 14, 1788 – May 4, 1859) was a U.S. representative from New York, serving two nonconsecutive terms from 1843 to 1845, and from 1849 to 1851.

== Early life ==
Phoenix was born in Morristown, New Jersey on January 14, 1788, the son of Daniel Phoenix (1737–1812) and Anna Lewis (née Phillips) Phoenix (1765–1854). He received a limited schooling and became a merchant. His father was a prominent citizen of Long Island who moved to Morristown in the Province of New Jersey when the British occupied Long Island. After the Revolutionary War, the family moved to New York and his father served as city treasurer.

His paternal grandparents were Alexander and Cornelia Phoenix, descendants of English immigrants to New Amsterdam. His maternal grandfather was Jonas Phillips of Morristown and his mother was the great-granddaughter of Rev. George Phillips, the progenitor of the New England Phillips family in America.

== Career ==
From 1810 to 1814, he was partners with Thomas Alsop in the merchant firm of Phoenix & Alsop at 27 Front Street in New York City. From 1814 to 1827, the firm was known as J. P. Phoenix & Co. and was located at 22 South Street in New York City. The business continued to be run by his brother, John Doughty Phoenix under the name of Phoenix & Co., located at 65 Water Street.

=== Political career ===
Phoenix served as an Alderman of the first ward in 1840, 1842, and 1847. In 1842, he was appointed a commissioner of the Croton Aqueduct Works.

Phoenix was elected as a Whig to the Twenty-eighth Congress from March 4, 1843 until March 3, 1845. He declined to be a candidate for renomination in 1844.

He was an unsuccessful candidate for election in 1846 to the Thirtieth Congress and served as chairman of the Whig General Committee in 1846 and 1847. He was a member of the New York State Assembly (New York Co., 1st D.) in 1848, serving in the 71st New York State Legislature.

Phoenix was again elected to the House of Representatives, serving from March 4, 1849 until March 3, 1851 as part of the Thirty-first Congress. While renominated in 1850, he declined to be a candidate.

== Personal life ==
Phoenix was married to Mary Whitney (1810–1876). Mary was the daughter of Harriet (née Suydam) Whitney and Stephen Whitney, one of the wealthiest merchants in New York City. They were the parents of:

- Whitney Phoenix (1830–1833), who died young.
- Mary Caroline Phoenix (1832–1901), who married George Henry Warren (1823–1892), a lawyer, in 1851.
- Phillips Phoenix (1834–1921), a Harvard Law School graduate and lawyer in New York City.
- Harriet Whitney Phoenix (b. 1835), who married Isaac Bronson (b. 1835), a lawyer who was the son of Dr. Oliver Bronson, in 1859.
- Anne Lewis Phoenix (1837–1858), who died unmarried.
- Stephen Whitney Phoenix (1839–1881), a Columbia College and Columbia Law School graduate who lived in New York City and Newport, Rhode Island.
- Lloyd Phoenix (1841–1926), a U.S. Naval Academy graduate who lived in New York City.

Phoenix died at his home, 18 State Street in New York City, on May 4, 1859. He was interred in the Presbyterian Cemetery, Morristown, New Jersey.

=== Descendants ===
Through his daughter Mary, he was the grandfather of nine, including Harriette Warren (1854–1912), who married Robert Goelet (1841–1899), the parents of Robert Walton Goelet; prominent Gilded Age architect Whitney Warren (1864–1943), who married Charlotte Tooker (1864–1951); Lloyd Warren (1868–1922), who was also an architect, and George Henry Warren II (1855–1943), a stockbroker who was the father of Constance Whitney Warren.

U.S. House of Representatives
Preceded by Charles G. Ferris; Fernando Wood; James I. Roosevelt; John McKeon	Member of the U.S. House of Representatives from New York's 3rd congressional district 1843–1845	Succeeded by William S. Miller
Preceded by Henry Nicoll	Member of the U.S. House of Representatives from New York's 3rd congressional district 1849–1851	Succeeded by Emanuel B. Hart
