= Joseph M. Warren =

American politician

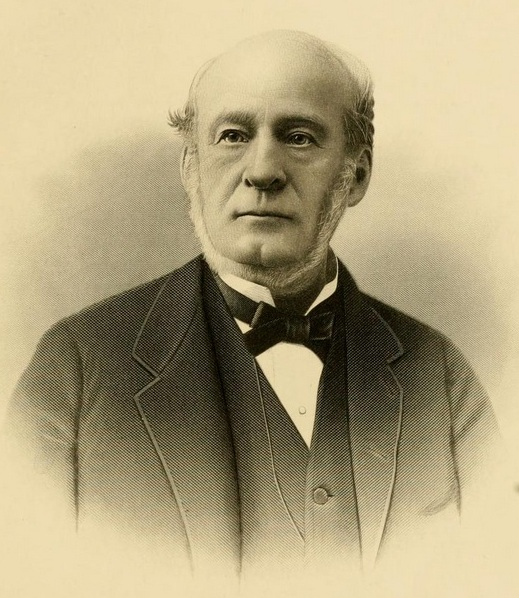
- Joseph Mabbett Warren, U.S. Representative from New York

Member of the U.S. House of Representatives from New York's 15th district
- In office March 4, 1871 – March 3, 1873
- Preceded by: Adolphus H. Tanner
- Succeeded by: Eli Perry

Personal details
- Born: January 28, 1813 Troy, New York, US
- Died: September 10, 1896 (aged 83) Troy, New York, US
- Party: Democratic
- Education: Washington College
- Occupation: Banker

Joseph Mabbett Warren (January 28, 1813 – September 10, 1896) was a U.S. representative from New York.

Born in Troy, New York, Warren attended the local schools, and in 1827 entered Rensselaer Polytechnic Institute in Troy, NY. He graduated from the Washington (now Trinity) College, Hartford, Connecticut, in 1834. He worked as a clerk in New York for a year and returned to Troy, New York, where he engaged in the wholesale grocery business for several years. He entered the wholesale hardware business in 1840. He was one of the directors of the Bank of Troy and of the United National Bank of Troy, and president of the Bank of Troy 1853-1865. He was also a trustee of Rensselaer Polytechnic Institute. He served as mayor of Troy in 1852. He was appointed as a commissioner of the Troy Water Works Company in 1855 and served until 1867, when he resigned.

Warren was elected as a Democrat to the Forty-second Congress. He was not a candidate for renomination in 1872.

Warren resumed his former business activities in Troy, New York, where he died September 10, 1896. He was interred in the Warren Chapel in Oakwood Cemetery.

== Family ==
Warren was the son of Stephen Warren (1783-1847) and Martha Cornell (nee Mabbett) Warren (1791-1879), which is where his middle name came from.

Warren's sister Phebe Elizabeth Warren married Henry Pratt McKean, a railroad executive in Pennsylvania and grandson of Signer of the Declaration of Independence Thomas McKean. Their 2nd great-grandson is David McKean (diplomat), a United States Ambassador to Luxembourg under President Barack Obama from 2016 to 2017.

Warren's sister Anna Chester Warren married Edward Ingersoll, a son of United States Congressman Charles Jared Ingersoll, grandson of Pennsylvania lawyer and politician Jared Ingersoll, and nephew of United States Congressman Joseph Reed Ingersoll.

His first cousin was George Henry Warren, one of the founders of the New York Metropolitan Opera. His great-nephew was Robert Sturgis Ingersoll, president of the Philadelphia Museum of Art from 1948 to 1964.

== Sources ==
- United States Congress. "Joseph M. Warren (id: W000165)". Biographical Directory of the United States Congress.

U.S. House of Representatives
Preceded by Adolphus H. Tanner	Member of the U.S. House of Representatives from New York's 15th congressional district 1871–1873	Succeeded by Eli Perry
