= Château de Villiers-le-Mahieu =

Modernised castle in Île-de-France, France

Coordinates: 48.8582°N 1.7679°E

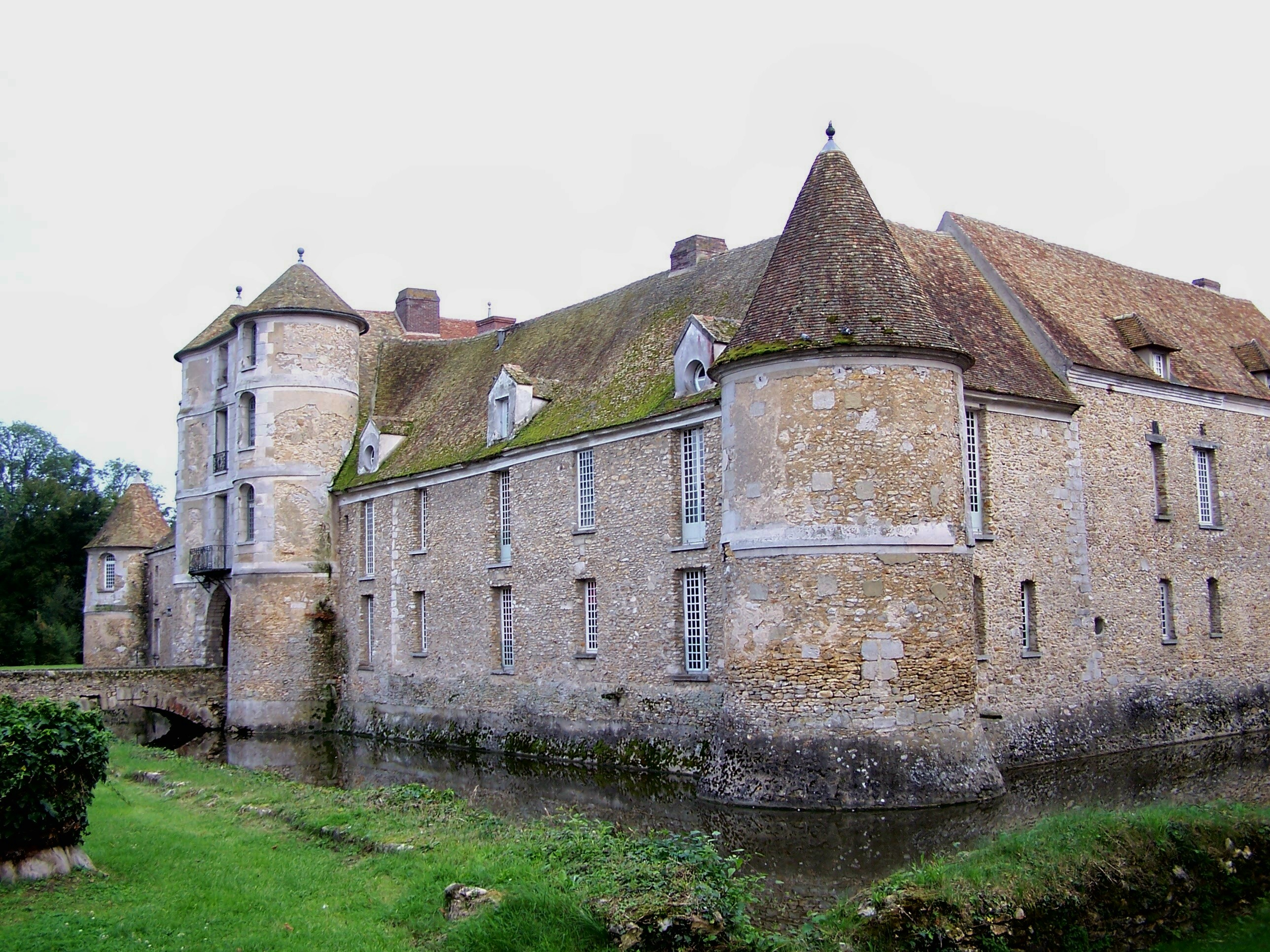
Eastern facade of the castle of Villiers-le-Mahieu (Yvelines, France)

The Château de Villiers-le-Mahieu is a modernised castle in the commune of Villiers-le-Mahieu in the Yvelines département of France. It was built in the 13th century and was extensively remodelled in the 17th. It is now in use as a hotel.

== History ==
According to legend, the original castle was built by the English in the Middle Ages. The original 13th-century castle moats surround the château. In 1642, the Marquis Claude d'Attilly built the present Renaissance style structure on the remains of the original. It was restored in 1965 by the Comte de Rohan Chabot and was the home of the French Expressionist painter, Bernard Buffet, from 1971 to 1979. In 1980, a young hotelier, Jean-Luc Chaufour, began a process of establishing a top class hotel within the castle and its grounds.

It has been listed since 1964 as a monument historique by the French Ministry of Culture.

== See also ==
- List of castles in France
