= William Starr Miller House =

Mansion in Manhattan, New York

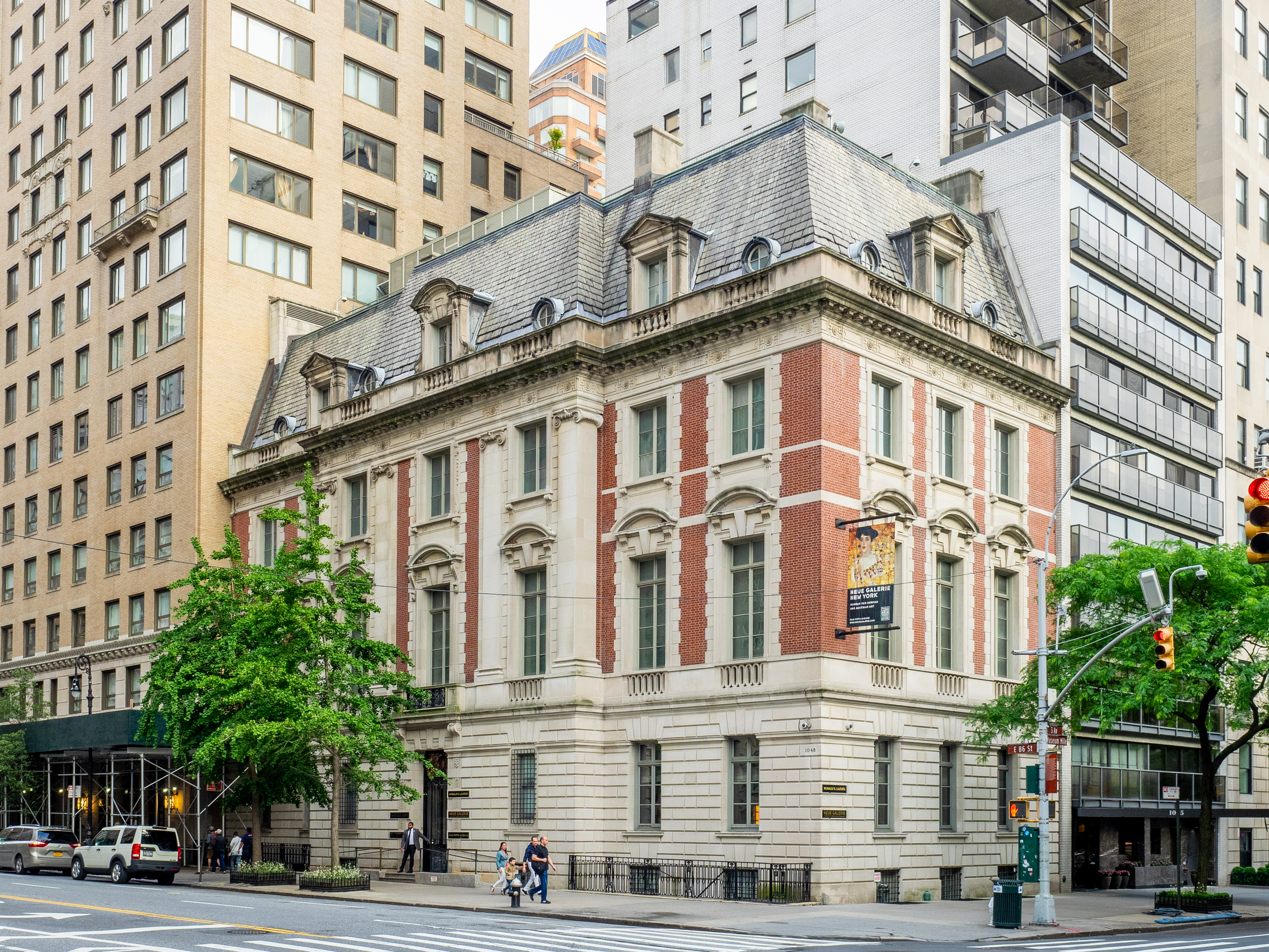
- View of the house in 2019

General information
- Location: 1048 Fifth Avenue, New York, NY 10028
- Coordinates: 40°46′53″N 73°57′37″W
- Completed: 1914

Design and construction
- Architecture firm: Carrère and Hastings

The William Starr Miller House is a mansion at 1048 Fifth Avenue on the Upper East Side of Manhattan in New York City. Prior to Miller’s development of the property, the site was home to David Mayer (died in 1914), a founder of the David Mayer Brewing Company and a friend of Oscar S. Straus.

== History ==
It was originally constructed for the industrialist William Starr Miller. Miller hired architectural firm Carrere and Hastings to design a six-story Louis XIII style townhouse for himself and his family, to be located in Manhattan at 1048 Fifth Avenue (on the southeast corner with East 86th Street). The work was completed in 1914.

Miller's daughter Edith Starr Miller married the widowed Lord Queenborough in July 1921, in the music room. Miller died at the house in 1935 and his widow continued to live there until her death in 1944.

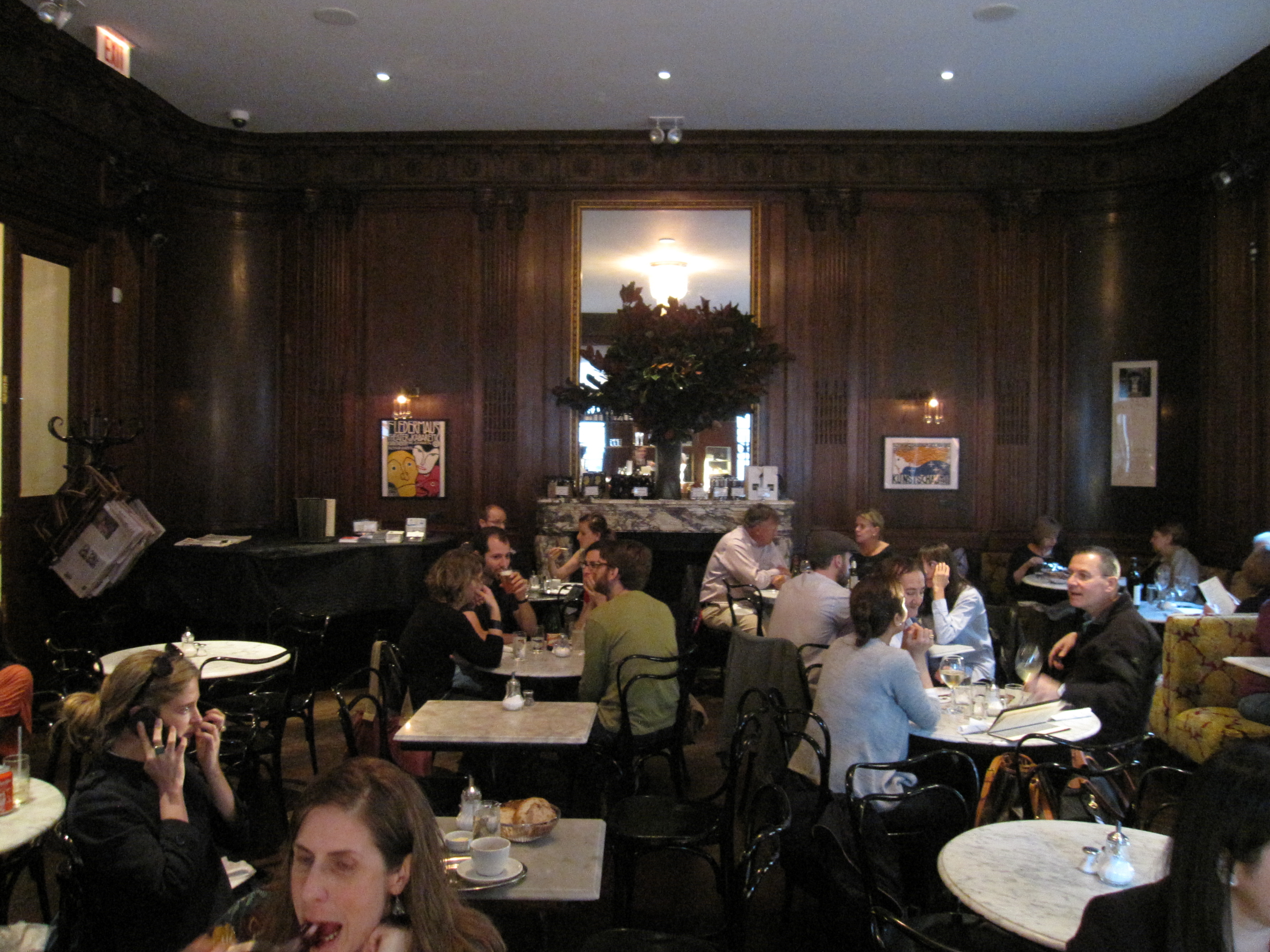
Cafe Sabarsky inside the Neue Galerie New York, the museum inside the William Starr Miller House

After Mrs. Miller's death, the townhouse was occupied by Grace Vanderbilt, wife of Cornelius Vanderbilt III, and then by the YIVO Institute for Jewish Research. Purchased in 1994 by art dealer and museum exhibition organizer Serge Sabarsky and cosmetics billionaire Ronald S. Lauder, the building was fully renovated by German architect Annabelle Selldorf and restored to its original state. It contains the Neue Galerie New York, which opened on November 16, 2001.
