= William S. Miller =

American politician (1793–1854)

Member of the U.S. House of Representatives from New York's 3rd district
- In office March 4, 1845 – March 3, 1847
- Preceded by: Jonas P. Phoenix
- Succeeded by: Henry Nicoll

Personal details
- Born: William Starr Miller; August 22, 1793 Wintonbury, Connecticut, U.S.
- Died: November 9, 1854 (aged 61) New York City, U.S.
- Resting place: Greenwood Cemetery, New York City, U.S.
- Party: American
- Relatives: William Starr Miller II (nephew)
- Profession: Politician

William Starr Miller I (August 22, 1793 – November 9, 1854) was a U.S. representative from New York.

== Biography ==
Born in Wintonbury, Connecticut, Miller completed preparatory studies. He served as member of the Board of Aldermen of New York City in 1845.

Miller was elected as an American Party candidate to the Twenty-ninth Congress (March 4, 1845-March 3, 1847). He was an unsuccessful candidate for reelection in 1846 to the Thirtieth Congress. He died in New York City November 9, 1854. He was interred in Greenwood Cemetery, Brooklyn, New York.

== Legacy ==
William Starr Miller II, his nephew, born two years after his death, was named in his honor.

U.S. House of Representatives
Preceded by Jonas P. Phoenix	Member of the U.S. House of Representatives from New York's 3rd congressional district 1845–1847	Succeeded by Henry Nicoll
