= William FitzGerald, 2nd Duke of Leinster =

Anglo-Irish politician and landowner

His Grace The Duke of Leinster KP PC (Ire)
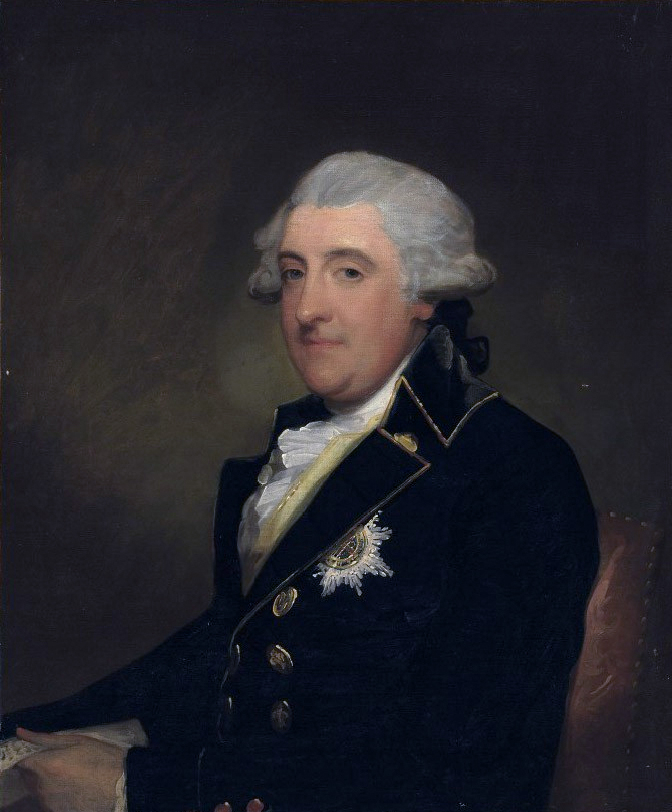
- Portrait by Gilbert Stuart

Master of the Rolls in Ireland
- In office 1788–1789
- Preceded by: Richard Rigby
- Succeeded by: The Earl of Glandore; The Earl of Carysfort

Clerk of the Crown in Ireland
- In office 1795–1797
- Preceded by: Sir Lucius O'Brien
- Succeeded by: Lord Glentworth

Member of the House of Lords Lord Temporal
- In office 19 November 1773 – 20 October 1804; Hereditary Peerage
- Preceded by: James FitzGerald, 1st Duke of Leinster
- Succeeded by: Augustus FitzGerald, 3rd Duke of Leinster

Member of Parliament for Dublin City
- In office 1767–1773

Member of Parliament for Kildare Borough
- In office 1768–1769

Personal details
- Born: 12 March 1749 London, Great Britain
- Died: 20 October 1804 (aged 55) Carton, Ireland
- Spouse: Emilia Olivia St George (m. 1775; died 1798)
- Children: Lady Mary Lockhart-Ross; Lady Emily FitzGerald; Lady Elizabeth Baker; George FitzGerald, Marquess of Kildare; Cecilia Foley, Baroness Foley; Olivia Kinnaird, Baroness Kinnaird; Augustus FitzGerald, 3rd Duke of Leinster; Lord William FitzGerald; Isabella Charlotte de Rohan-Chabot, Comtess de Jarnac
- Parents: James FitzGerald, 1st Duke of Leinster; Lady Emily Lennox

Military service
- Allegiance: Ireland
- Branch/service: Irish Volunteers
- Rank: Colonel
- Unit: Dublin Volunteers

William Robert FitzGerald, 2nd Duke of Leinster, KP, PC (Ire) (12/13 March 1749 – 20 October 1804) was an Anglo-Irish liberal and landowner.

== Career ==
FitzGerald made his Grand Tour between 1768 and 1769. During the same time, he also was Member of Parliament (MP) for Kildare Borough. FitzGerald then sat in the Irish House of Commons for Dublin City until 1773, when he inherited his father's title and estates. He was appointed High Sheriff of Kildare for 1772. Politically he was a liberal supporter of Henry Grattan's Irish Patriot Party and he co-founded the Irish Whig Club in 1789. He controlled about six Kildare members of the Irish House of Commons. In 1779, he was elected colonel of the Dublin Regiment of the Irish Volunteers.

In 1770, FitzGerald was chosen Grandmaster of the masonic Grand Lodge of Ireland, which post he held for two years. He was re-elected for another year in 1777. In 1783 he was among the first knights in the newly created Order of St. Patrick.

In 1788–9, he was Master of the Rolls in Ireland; in theory a senior judicial office, it was then largely a sinecure, but so blatant a choice of a man who was wholly unqualified for it gave rise to unfavourable comment, and a few years later it became the rule that the Master must be a lawyer of repute.

FitzGerald was a supporter of Catholic emancipation and helped to found the Catholic seminary at Maynooth on land he donated, in 1795. Withdrawing from Parliament with Grattan in 1797, he moved to England to be with his sick wife and remained there during the 1798 rebellion.

== Family ==
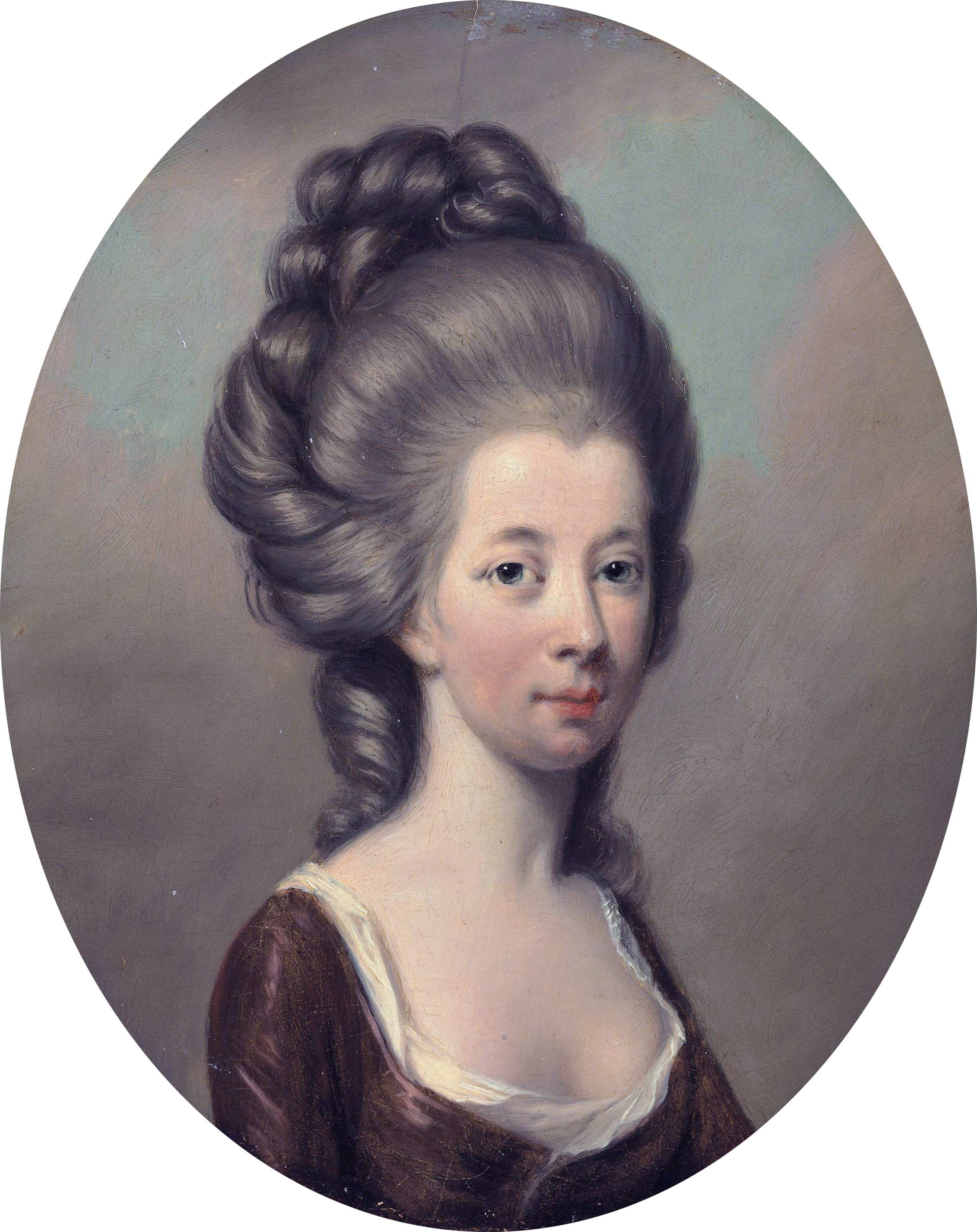
Emilia Olivia St George, the Duchess of Leinster (Hugh Douglas Hamilton)

He was the second, but eldest surviving, son of James FitzGerald, 1st Duke of Leinster, and the well-connected Lady Emily Lennox, daughter of the 2nd Duke of Richmond. He was also the elder brother of the 1790s revolutionary Lord Edward FitzGerald, and was a first cousin of the English liberal politician Charles James Fox. On 4 or 7 November 1775 he married The Hon. Emilia Olivia Usher St George (died 23 June 1798, London), daughter of The 1st Baron Saint George and Elizabeth Dominick and sole grand daughter of Sir Christopher Dominick. Their children were:

- Lady Mary Rebecca FitzGerald (6 May 1777 – 28 September 1842). Married 15 April 1799, Sir Charles Lockhart-Ross, 7th Baronet.
- Lady Emily Elizabeth FitzGerald (13 May 1778 – 9 February 1856). Married 13 March 1801, John Joseph Henry of Straffan.
- Lady Elizabeth FitzGerald (1780 – 28 February 1857). Married 22 July 1805, Sir Edward Baker, 1st Baronet.
- George FitzGerald, Marquess of Kildare (20 June 1783 – 10 February 1784).
- Lady Cecilia Olivia Geraldine FitzGerald (3 March 1786 – London, 27 July 1863). Married 18 August 1806, Thomas Foley, 3rd Baron Foley.
- Lady Olivia Letitia Catherine FitzGerald (9 September 1787 – 28 February 1858). Married 8 May 1806, Charles Kinnaird, 8th Baron Kinnaird.
- Augustus FitzGerald, 3rd Duke of Leinster (1791 – 1874). Married Lady Charlotte Augusta Stanhope.
- Lord William Charles O'Brien FitzGerald (4 January 1793 – 8 December 1864). Married and had issue:
  - Geraldine Sydney FitzGerald (died 1896). Married 2 October 1855, Henry William Paget Butler.
- Lady Isabella Charlotte FitzGerald (died 1868). Married 1 June 1809, Major-General Louis Guy Charles Guillaume de Rohan-Chabot, Comte de Jarnac. Had issue:
  - Philippe-Ferdinand-Auguste de Rohan-Chabot (1815-1875). Comte de Jarnac.

His homes were at Carton, where he died, and Kilkea in County Kildare, and at Leinster House in Dublin (now the home of the Oireachtas). He was a founder member of the Order of St Patrick in 1783 and of the Royal Irish Academy (1785), and was a large investor in the Royal Canal company launched in 1790. His family's estates of 60,000 acres (25,000 Ha) in Kildare were in three main parts, around Maynooth, Rathangan and Athy. He rebuilt the main bridge in Athy over the River Barrow. The streets either side of the bridge are called William Street, Duke Street (both on the western side of the river) and Leinster Street (on the eastern side).

Ancestors of William FitzGerald, 2nd Duke of Leinster

16. George FitzGerald, 16th Earl of Kildare
8. Robert FitzGerald
17. Joan Boyle
4. Robert FitzGerald, 19th Earl of Kildare
18. James Clotworthy
9. Mary Clotworthy
19. Mary Rowley
2. James FitzGerald, 1st Duke of Leinster
20. William O'Brien, 2nd Earl of Inchiquin
10. William O'Brien, 3rd Earl of Inchiquin
21. Margaret Boyle (niece of 17)
5. Mary O'Brien
22. Edward Villiers
11. Mary Villiers
23. Frances Howard
1. William FitzGerald, 2nd Duke of Leinster
24. Charles II of England and Scotland
12. Charles Lennox, 1st Duke of Richmond
25. Louise de Kérouaille, Duchess of Portsmouth
6. Charles Lennox, 2nd Duke of Richmond
26. Francis Brudenell, Baron Brudenell
13. Anne Brudenell
27. Frances Savile
3. Emily Lennox
28. Henry Cadogan
14. William Cadogan, 1st Earl Cadogan
29. Bridget Waller
7. Sarah Cadogan
30. Joannes Munter
15. Margaret Cecilia Munter
31. Marguerite Trip

== See also ==
- Duke of Leinster

== Notes ==
Parliament of Ireland
Preceded by James Grattan; Charles Lucas	Member of Parliament for Dublin City; 1767–1773; With: Charles Lucas 1767–1771; William Clement 1771–1773	Succeeded by William Clement; Redmond Morres
Preceded by Henry Sandford; Garret FitzGerald	Member of Parliament for Kildare Borough; 1768–1769; With: Maurice Keating	Succeeded by Simon Digby; Joseph Henry
Masonic offices
Preceded by The Earl of Kingston	Grandmaster of the Grand Lodge of Ireland; 1770–1772	Succeeded by Viscount Dunluce
Preceded by The Earl of Mornington	Grandmaster of the Grand Lodge of Ireland; 1777–1778	Succeeded by The Earl of Antrim
Legal offices
Preceded by Richard Rigby	Master of the Rolls in Ireland; 1788–1789	Succeeded by The Earl of Glandore and The Earl of Carysfort (joint)
Preceded by Sir Lucius O'Brien, Bt	Clerk of the Crown and Hanaper; 1795–1797	Succeeded by The Lord Glentworth
Peerage of Ireland
Preceded by James FitzGerald	Duke of Leinster; 1773–1804	Succeeded by Augustus FitzGerald
