= Whitney Warren =

American architect (1864–1943)

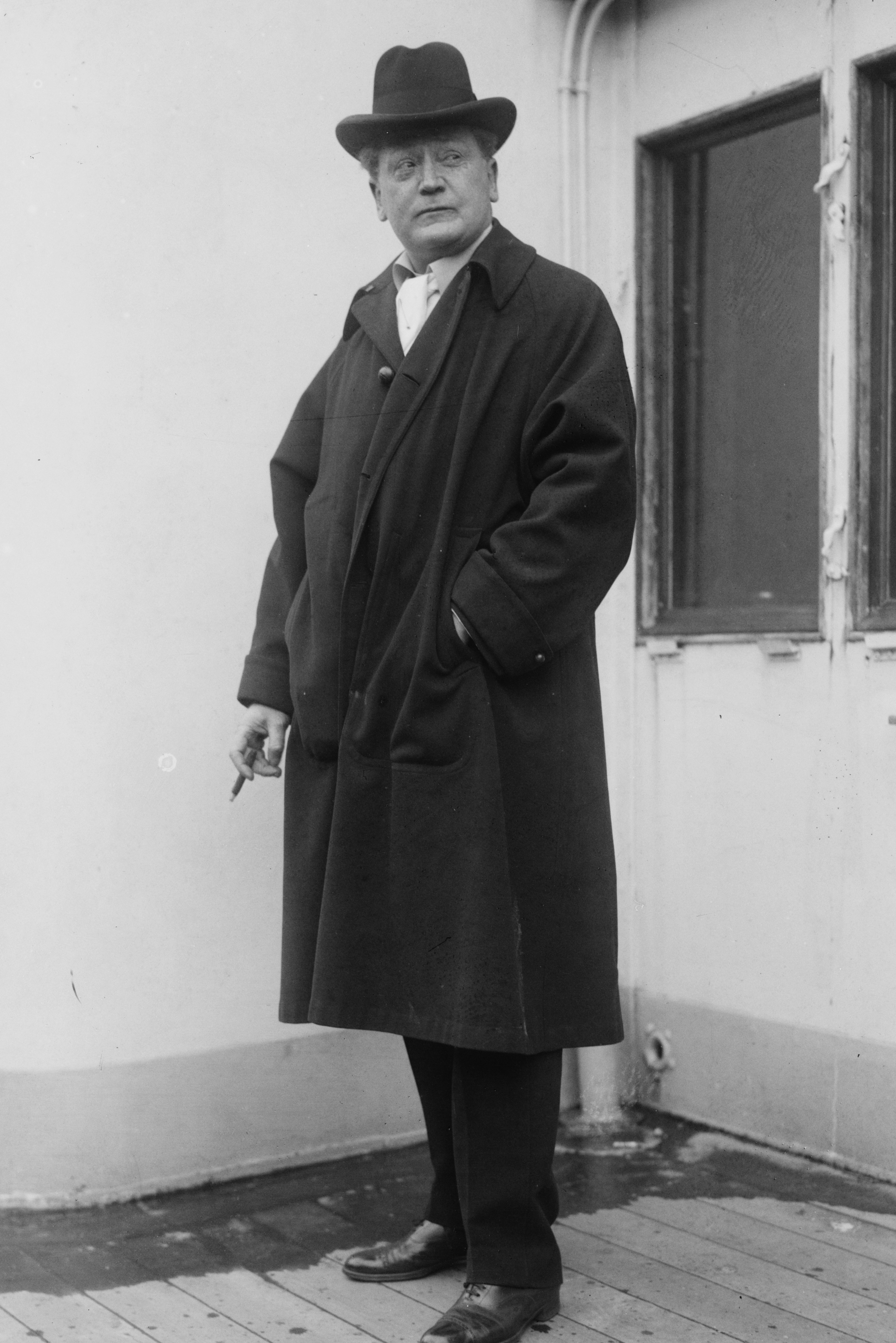
- Warren in 1915
- Born: January 29, 1864; New York City, U.S.
- Died: January 24, 1943 (aged 78); New York City, U.S.
- Education: Columbia University; École des Beaux-Arts
- Occupation: Architect
- Spouse: Charlotte Augusta Tooker (m. 1884)
- Parent(s): George Henry Warren; Mary Caroline Phoenix Warren
- Practice: Warren and Wetmore
- Buildings: New York Yacht Club Building, Grand Central Terminal, Biltmore Hotel, Catholic University of Leuven Library

Whitney Warren (January 29, 1864 – January 24, 1943) was an American Beaux-Arts architect who founded, with Charles Delevan Wetmore, Warren and Wetmore in New York City, one of the most prolific and successful architectural practices in the US.

== Early life ==
Warren was born in New York City on January 29, 1864. He was one of nine children born to George Henry Warren I (1823–1892) and Mary Caroline (née Phoenix) Warren (1832–1901). His siblings included Lloyd Warren, who was also an architect, and George Henry Warren II, a stockbroker who was the father of Constance Whitney Warren. He was a cousin of the Goelets (Note: His sister Harriette Louise Warren (1854-1912) was married to Robert Goelet and was the mother of Robert Walton Goelet (1880–1941).) and Vanderbilts (Note: His relative, Lucy Warren (1853–1894), was married to Benjamin Kissam (1818–1891), the brother of Maria (née Kissam) Vanderbilt (1821–1896), wife of William Henry Vanderbilt.) and the grandson of U.S. Representative Jonas Phillips Phoenix. (Note: Warren's paternal grandfather Nathan Warren (1777–1834) was the brother of Stephan Warren (1783–1847), father of Joseph M. Warren (1813–1896), a U.S. Representative from New York.)

In 1883, he enrolled at Columbia University to study architecture, but only stayed for one year. He was shown on official Columbia University records as a member of the class of 1885 of the School of Mines, Columbia University. From 1884 until 1894, Warren spent ten years at the École des Beaux-Arts in Paris. There he studied under Honoré Daumet and Charles Girault, and met fellow architecture student Emmanuel Louis Masqueray, who would, in 1897, join the Warren and Wetmore firm.

== Career ==
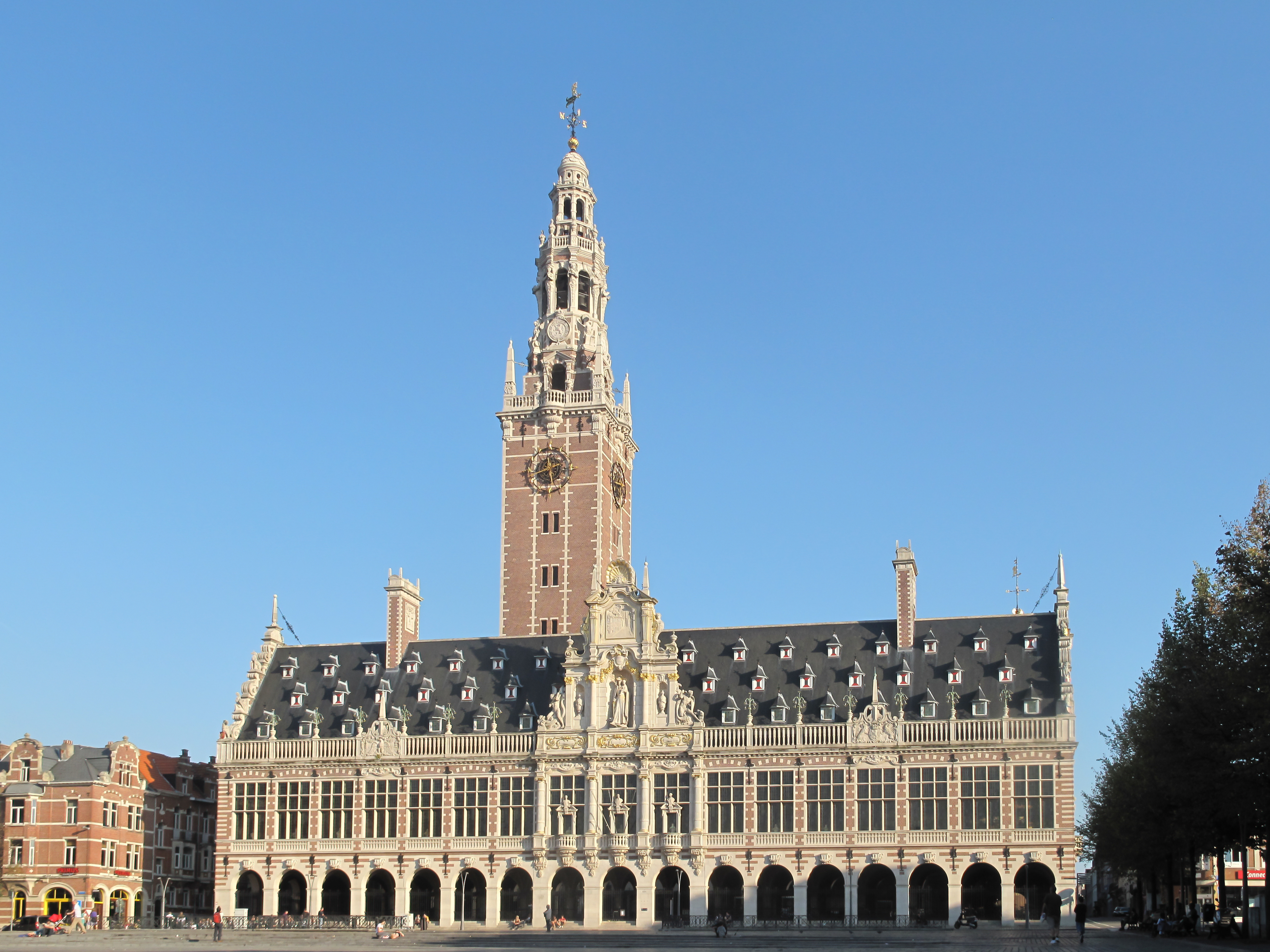
The Catholic University of Leuven Library designed by Warren and built from 1921–1928

Warren returned to New York in 1894, and began practicing as an architect. One of his first clients was the lawyer Charles Delevan Wetmore. After their successful collaboration, Warren convinced Wetmore to become his partner and they organized Warren and Wetmore with Warren as the architect and Wetmore responsible for the business side of the firm.

During World War I, Warren was involved in organizing the Comité des Étudiants Américains de l'École des Beaux-Arts Paris; a student-run charity in support of the French cause. He also supported actively the claims of Italy in the Adriatic, during and after the war. He was an intimate friend of Gabriele d'Annunzio, and was appointed diplomatic representative in the United States of the "Free State of Fiume". He was the author of Les Justes Revendications de l'Italie: la Question de Trente, de Trieste et de l'Adriatique. Many of his addresses, delivered 1914-1919, were published and widely distributed.

Warren retired in 1931, but occasionally served as consultant. Warren took particular pride in his design of the new library building of the Catholic University of Leuven, which was finished in 1928. The library was severely damaged by British and German forces during World War II, but was completely restored after the war.

Two of the firm's major works were the construction of Grand Central Terminal and of the Biltmore Hotel, both in New York City.

== Personal life ==
In 1884, Warren was married to Charlotte Augusta Tooker (1864–1951) in Newport, Rhode Island. Charlotte was the eldest daughter of Gabriel Mead Tooker, a prominent New York lawyer and member of Mrs. Astor's famous "Four Hundred". She was also the cousin of Col. Clermont Livingston Best's daughter, Annie Livingston Tooker Best, wife of Elizur Yale Smith, the son of Wellington Smith, members of the Yale family. Together, they are the parents of:

- Charlotte Augusta Warren (1885–1957), who married William Greenough in 1907.
- Gabrielle Warren (1895–1971), who married Reginald Bulkeley Rives (1890–1957), a nephew of George Rives and Edward Bulkeley, in 1917.
- Whitney Warren Jr. (1898–1986), who was a horticulturalist and patron of the arts. Warren Jr. was referred to as "an overly rich bachelor operating in San Francisco" who traveled around the world. In 1920, he was engaged to Geraldine Graham, daughter of "California Oil King" William Miller Graham, but the engagement was called off.

In 1927, Warren and his brother George each inherited $2,314,143 from the estate of their uncle, Lloyd Phoenix.

Warren died after a nine-week illness on January 24, 1943, at New York Hospital in New York City. At the time of his death, Warren resided at 280 Park Avenue in New York City and was a member of the Knickerbocker Club, the Racquet and Tennis Club, and the Church and South Side Sportsmen's Clubs. After a service at St. Thomas Church, Fifth Avenue, he was buried at Island Cemetery in Newport. His widow died in 1951 and was buried alongside him in Newport.

=== Legacy ===
In 1917, Warren received the Medal of Honor from the American Institute of Architects for the firm's work.

Works by Warren are found in the collection of the Cooper-Hewitt, National Design Museum.
