= Metropolitan Opera House (39th Street) =

Opera house in Manhattan, New York

Coordinates: 40°45′15″N 73°59′15″W

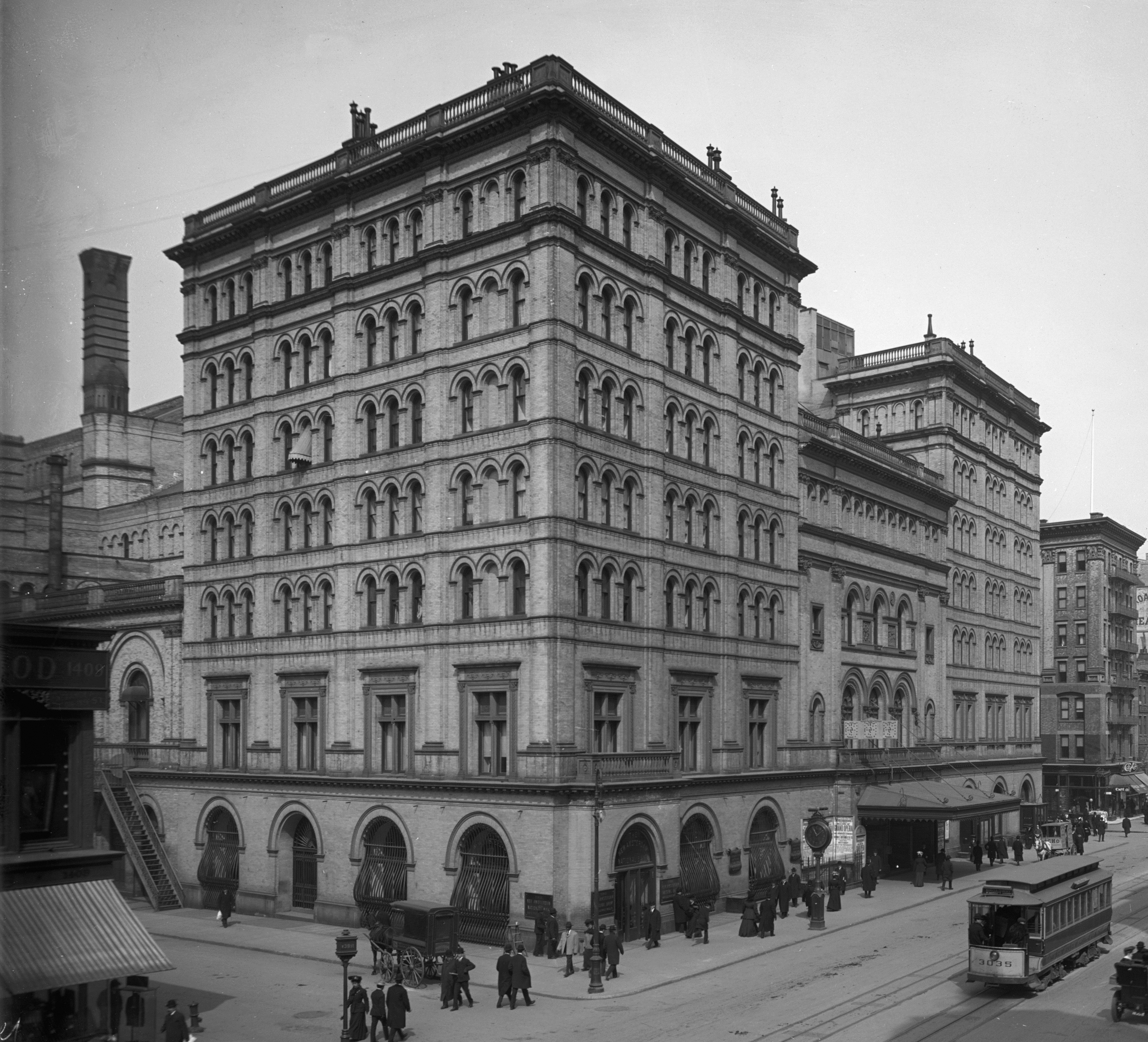
- Metropolitan Opera House in 1905, looking uptown

General information
- Architectural style: Renaissance Revival architecture
- Location: Manhattan, New York City, United States
- Opened: 1883
- Demolished: 1967

Design and construction
- Architect: J. Cleaveland Cady

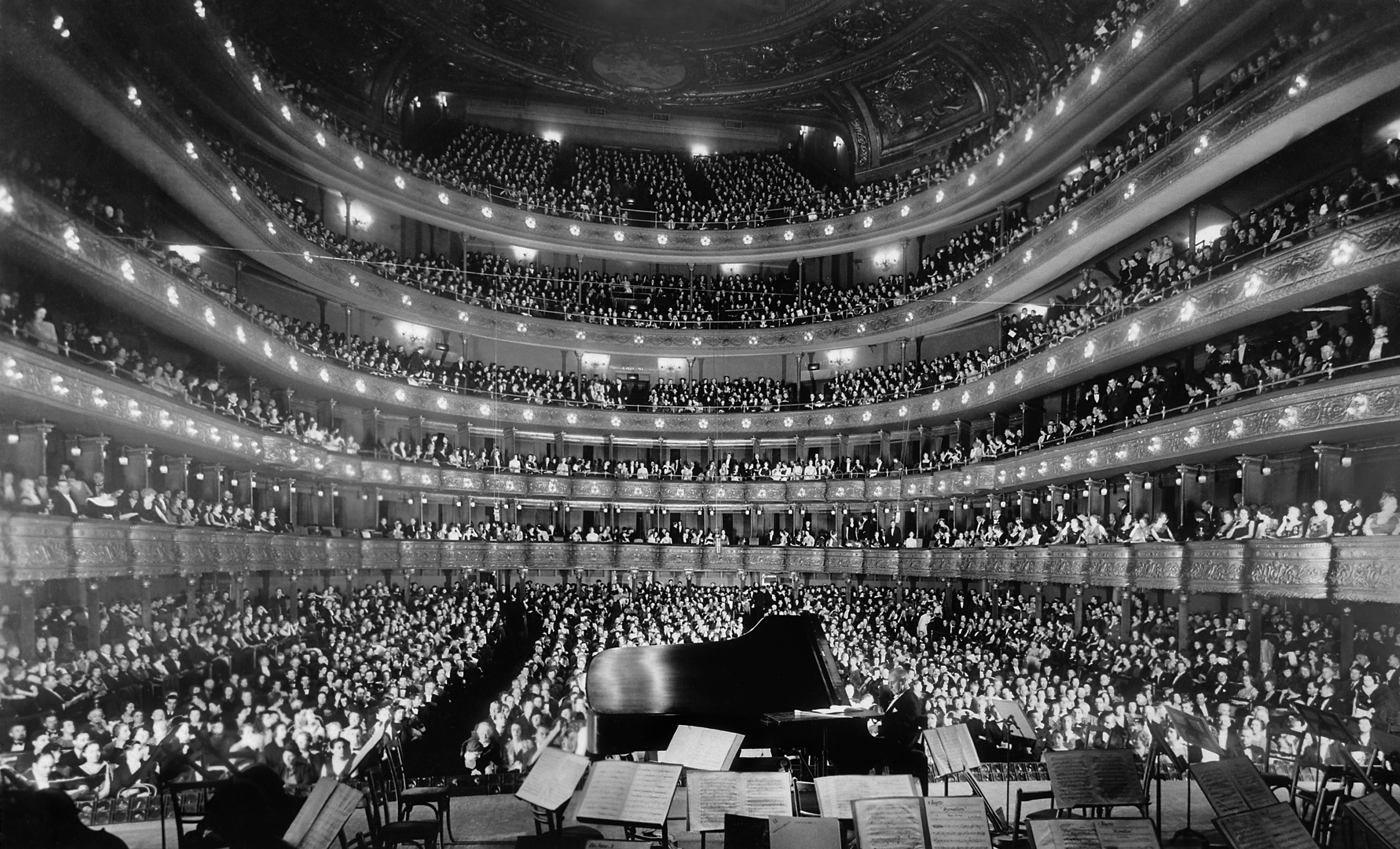
Recital at the old Met by pianist Josef Hofmann, November 28, 1937

The Metropolitan Opera House, also known as the Old Metropolitan Opera House and Old Met, was an opera house located at 1411 Broadway in Manhattan, New York City. Opened in 1883 and demolished in 1967, it was the first home of the Metropolitan Opera.

== History ==
Prior to the building of the Metropolitan Opera House, the Academy of Music (AM) was the venue for opera which catered to the upper classes of New York City; particularly those of the Knickerbocker circle. The eighteen box seats at the AM were cherished by the old guard of New York society, with Edith Wharton later stating that "conservatives loved it for keeping out the 'new people' ". Attempts were made by the Vanderbilt family through their lawyer George Henry Warren to improve the situation at the AM by offering to pay for a remodeling and expansion of the number of boxes at the AM. But the social circle of new money represented by industrialists and bankers was not welcome among the old money elite at the AM, and the offer was rejected by the AM's stock holders.

In response, a campaign to build a new opera house was formed which was spearheaded by William Henry Vanderbilt. The Metropolitan Opera Company was founded in 1883. The Metropolitan Opera House opened on October 22, 1883, with a performance of Faust. The opening, which was attended by numerous dignitaries including some from the Astors and the Vanderbilts, was the subject of a three-column front-page story in The New York Times.

The opera house was located at 1411 Broadway, occupying the whole block between West 39th Street and West 40th Street on the west side of the street in the Garment District of Midtown Manhattan. Nicknamed "The Yellow Brick Brewery" for its industrial looking exterior, the original Metropolitan Opera House was designed by J. Cleaveland Cady. Critical reception of the original Metropolitan Opera House was largely negative; one source called it "Disappointing ... flat, forceless and ineffective".

On August 27, 1892, the theater was gutted by fire. The 1892–1893 season was canceled while the opera house was rebuilt along its original lines. The Vaudeville Club (which eventually became the Metropolitan Opera Club) was founded that season, hosting entertainment in the undamaged portions of the house.

=== Enlargements ===
In 1903, architects Carrère and Hastings extensively redesigned the interior of the opera house. The golden auditorium with its sunburst chandelier, and curved proscenium inscribed with the names of six composers (Gluck, Mozart, Beethoven, Wagner, Gounod and Verdi), dated from this time. The first of the Met's signature gold damask stage curtains was installed in 1906, completing the look that the Old Metropolitan Opera House maintained until its closing.

In 1940, ownership of the opera house shifted from the wealthy families who occupied the theater's boxes to the non-profit Metropolitan Opera Association. At this time the last major change to the auditorium's interior was completed. The second tier of privately held boxes (the "grand tier") was converted into standard row seating. This enlarged the seating capacity and left only the first tier of boxes from the "golden horseshoe" of the opera house's origins as a showplace for New York society.

The Met had a seating capacity of 3,625 with 224 standing room places.

=== Decline ===
While the house was praised for its acoustics and interior, the backstage facilities of the theater were quickly deemed to be severely inadequate for a large opera company. Scenery and sets were a regular sight leaning against the building exterior on 39th Street where crews had to shift them between performances, often in inclement weather. Various plans were put forward over the years to build a new home for the company and designs for new opera houses were created by various architects including Joseph Urban. Proposed new locations included Columbus Circle and what is now Rockefeller Center, but none of these plans came to fruition. Only with the development of Lincoln Center on New York's Upper West Side did the Met finally have the opportunity to build an adequate, modern opera house.

The New York City Landmarks Preservation Commission considered designating the Old Met as a city landmark in 1966; if the building had been protected as a landmark, it would have been one of the first such designations in the city. The Metropolitan Opera left its old house on April 16, 1966, with a sentimental gala farewell performance featuring nearly all of the company's current leading artists. Despite a plea from conductor Leopold Stokowski and others, the Met management opposed the preservation of its old house, as Rudolf Bing, the Met's general manager at the time, did not want any rival opera companies purchasing the theatre for their own use. (The New York City Opera had tried to purchase the building to use as their main venue, but Bing opposed it) New York state senator John J. Marchi also tried to save the building and introduced legislation to preserve the opera house, but he was unsuccessful. The final performance at the opera house was given by the Bolshoi Ballet, which concluded a short run of appearances on May 8, 1966, and the Met moved to the new Metropolitan Opera House at Lincoln Center that September. The theater was purchased by Jack D. Weiler. The Old Met was razed in 1967 and was replaced by a 40-story office tower, 1411 Broadway, designed by Irwin S. Chanin.
