= Lloyd Warren =

French-born American architect

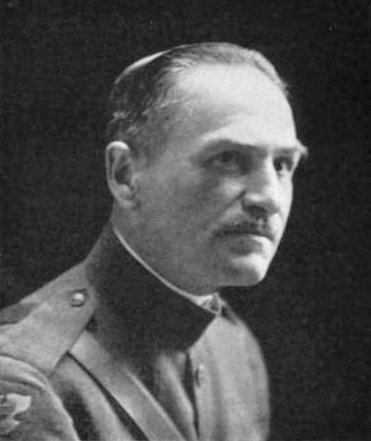
- Born: Lloyd Eliot Warren; November 10, 1868; Paris, France
- Died: October 25, 1922 (aged 53); New York, New York

Lloyd Eliot Warren (November 10, 1868 - October 25, 1922) was the founder of the Beaux-Arts Institute of Design in New York City

== Biography ==
He was born in Paris, France to George Henry Warren I (November 8, 1823 - April 8, 1892) and Mary Caroline Phoenix (February 27, 1832 - January 18, 1901). His brothers were Whitney Warren (of Warren & Wetmore, one of the most prestigious American architecture firms) and George Henry Warren II, a stockbroker.

=== Death ===
Lloyd E. Warren died on October 25, 1922, when he fell out an open window while sleepwalking in his apartment.

The Lloyd Warren Fellowship award was founded to continue his legacy.
